= Brent Faiyaz discography =

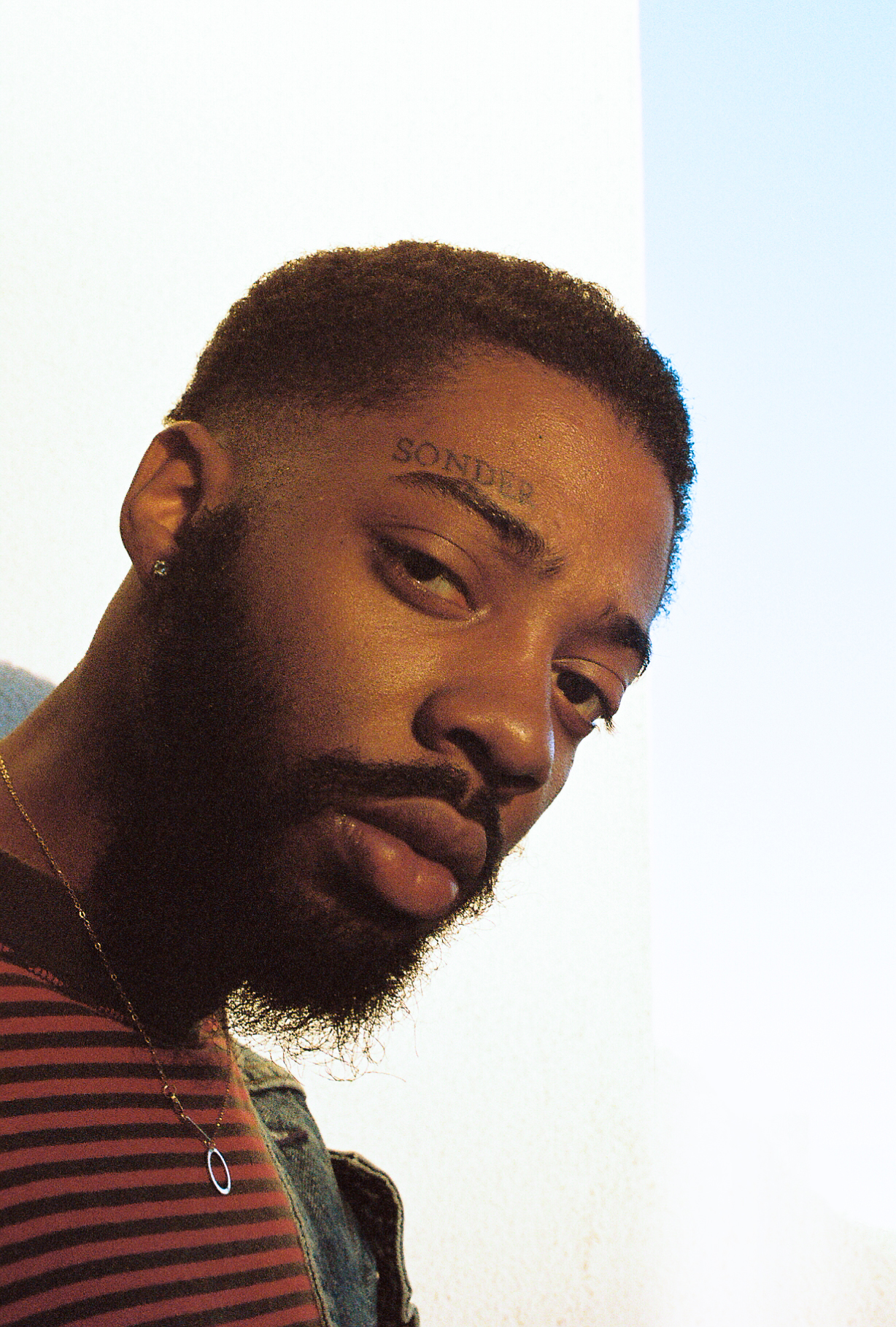
- Studio albums: 3
- EPs: 7
- Live albums: 1
- Compilation albums: 0
- Singles: 21
- Mixtapes: 1

The discography of American singer-songwriter Brent Faiyaz consists of three studio albums, six extended plays (EPs), one mixtape, and twenty-one singles (including four as a featured artist). His music has been released under his own independent record labels, Lost Kids and ISO Supremacy, and has been distributed by Stem, Venice Music, and UnitedMasters. Faiyaz has achieved one top-ten album on the Billboard 200 and three top fifty entries on the Billboard Hot 100.

After beginning his career in 2013, Faiyaz released his debut EP, Black Child. This was later followed by the release of its follow-up, A.M. Paradox in 2016, released under Faiyaz's record label, Lost Kids. In the same year, Faiyaz appeared as a guest appearance alongside Shy Glizzy on GoldLink's "Crew". The track peaked at number 45 on the Billboard Hot 100 and has received sextuple platinum certification by the Recording Industry Association of America (RIAA). The following year, Faiyaz released his debut studio album, Sonder Son. In 2018, Faiyaz released his third EP, Lost before releasing his Fuck the World EP in 2020. The EP peaked at number 20 on the Billboard 200, marking Faiyaz's first appearance on the chart, and was certified platinum by the RIAA and silver by the British Phonographic Industry (BPI). In 2022, Faiyaz released his sophomore studio album, Wasteland. The album debuted at number 2 on the Billboard 200, and was certified platinum by the RIAA and gold by the BPI. The album also peaked in the top 10 in Canada, New Zealand, Norway, and the United Kingdom. The album was preceded by the Billboard Hot 100-charting singles, "Gravity" with DJ Dahi featuring Tyler, the Creator, "Wasting Time" featuring Drake, and "Price of Fame", the former two both certified platinum by the RIAA.

In August 2023, Faiyaz founded his own creative agency and record label, ISO Supremacy. Under the label, in October of the same year, Faiyaz released his debut mixtape, Larger than Life which peaked at number 11 on the Billboard 200. In November, Faiyaz released his Apple Music exclusive live album, Apple Music Live: Brent Faiyaz. In February 2026, he released his third studio album, Icon.

== Albums ==
=== Studio albums ===
List of studio albums, with selected details, peak chart positions, and certifications
Title	Album details	Peak chart positions										Sales (Note: Sales figures for albums, EPs, and singles are pure sales that do not take equivalent units into account.)	Certifications
Title	Album details	US	AUS	BEL	CAN	DEN	IRE	NZ	NOR	SWI	UK	Sales	Certifications
Sonder Son	Released: October 13, 2017; Label: Lost Kids; Format: LP (Limited), digital download, streaming	—	—	—	—	—	—	—	—	—	—		RIAA: Gold
Wasteland	Released: July 8, 2022; Label: Lost Kids, Venice, Stem; Format: CD, LP, digital download, streaming	2	11	35	5	22	15	2	9	17	6	US: 6,000 (Note: Upon the album's release, Wasteland moved 6,000 pure copies in its first week.)	RIAA: Platinum; BPI: Gold; IFPI DEN: Gold; RMMZ: Platinum
Icon	Released: February 13, 2026; Label: ISO Supremacy, UnitedMasters; Format: CD, LP, cassette, digital download, streaming	6	19	68	19	22	78	12	52	9	28	US: 13,500	
"—" denotes a recording that did not chart or was not released in that territory.

=== Live albums ===
Title	Details
Apple Music Live: Brent Faiyaz	Released: November 29, 2023; Label: ISO Supremacy, UnitedMasters; Formats: Digital download

== Mixtapes ==
List of mixtapes, with selected details, peak chart positions, sales, and certifications
Title	Mixtape details	Peak chart positions										Sales (Note: Sales figures for albums, EPs, and singles are pure sales that do not take equivalent units into account.)	Certifications
Title	Mixtape details	US	BEL	CAN	DEN	IRE	NLD	NZ	NOR	SWI	UK	Sales	Certifications
Larger than Life	Released: October 27, 2023; Label: ISO Supremacy, UnitedMasters; Format: CD, LP, digital download, streaming	11	61	21	38	61	37	7	29	16	25	US: 1,000	RIAA: Gold; BPI: Silver; RMNZ: Gold

== Extended plays ==
List of extended plays
Title	Album details	Peak chart positions		Certifications
Title	Album details	US	UK	Certifications
Black Child EP	Released: December 19, 2013; Label: Self-released; Format: Digital download	—	—	
A.M. Paradox	Released: September 19, 2016; Label: Lost Kids; Format: LP, digital download, streaming	—	—	
Into (with Sonder)	Released: January 26, 2017; Label: Self-released; Format: LP (limited), digital download, streaming	—	—	
Lost	Released: October 19, 2018; Label: Lost Kids; Format: LP, digital download, streaming	—	—	RMNZ: Gold
Fuck the World	Released: February 7, 2020; Label: Lost Kids; Format: LP, digital download, streaming	20	70	RIAA: Platinum; BPI: Silver; RMNZ: Gold
Do Not Listen	Released: February 8, 2021; Label: Lost Kids; Format: Digital download, streaming	—	—	
Too Late to Die Young (with Sonder)	Released: October 21, 2022; Label: Self-released; Format: Digital download, streaming	—	—	
"—" denotes a recording that did not chart or was not released in that territory.

== Singles ==
=== As lead artist ===
List of singles, showing year released and selected chart positions
Title	Year	Peak chart positions									Certifications	Album
Title	Year	US	US R&B/HH	US R&B	CAN	IRE	NZ Hot	SA	UK	WW	Certifications	Album
"Natural Release"	2014	—	—	—	—	—	—	—	—	—		Non-album singles
"Allure"	2015	—	—	—	—	—	—	—	—	—		Non-album singles
"Running On E"	2015	—	—	—	—	—	—	—	—	—	RIAA: Gold	Non-album singles
"Invite Me"	2016	—	—	—	—	—	—	—	—	—		A.M. Paradox
"Poison"	2016	—	—	—	—	—	—	—	—	—	BPI: Silver; RMNZ: Platinum	A.M. Paradox
"Too Fast" (with Sonder)	2016	—	—	—	—	—	—	—	—	—	RMNZ: Gold	A.M. Paradox
"One Night Only" (with Sonder)	2018	—	—	—	—	—	—	—	—	—	RIAA: Platinum; RMNZ: Gold	Non-album single
"Trust"	2018	— (Note: "Trust" did not enter the Billboard Hot 100, but peaked at number 13 on the Bubbling Under Hot 100 chart.)	—	—	—	73	—	—	98	—	RIAA: 3× Platinum; BPI: Platinum; RMNZ: 2× Platinum	Lost
"What You Heard" (with Sonder)	2019	— (Note: "What You Heard" did not enter the Billboard Hot 100, but peaked at number 25 on the Bubbling Under Hot 100 chart.)	—	—	—	—	—	—	—	—	RIAA: Gold; RMNZ: Platinum	Non-album single
"Fuck the World (Summer in London)"	2019	—	—	—	—	—	—	—	—	—	RIAA: 2× Platinum; BPI: Silver; RMNZ: Gold	Fuck the World
"Rehab (Winter in Paris)"	2019	—	—	—	—	—	—	—	—	—	RIAA: 2× Platinum; BPI: Silver; RMNZ: Platinum	Fuck the World
"Dead Man Walking"	2020	— (Note: "Dead Man Walking" did not enter the Billboard Hot 100, but peaked at number six on the Bubbling Under Hot 100 chart.)	43	9	—	78	—	67	85	—	RIAA: 3× Platinum; BPI: Gold; RMNZ: Platinum	Wasteland
"Gravity" (with DJ Dahi featuring Tyler, the Creator)	2021	71	26	7	87	90	3	18	60	103	RIAA: 2× Platinum; BPI: Silver; RMNZ: Platinum	Wasteland
"Circles" (with Purr)	2021	—	—	—	—	—	—	—	—	—		Do Not Listen
"Show U Off"	2021	—	—	—	—	—	—	—	—	—		Non-album singles
"Nobody but You" (with Sonder and Jorja Smith)	2021	—	—	—	—	—	16	—	—	—	RIAA: Gold; RMNZ: Gold	Non-album singles
"Wasting Time" (featuring Drake)	2021	49	17	5	44	82	5	3	34	53	RIAA: Platinum	Wasteland
"Mercedes"	2021	98	32	11	—	—	25	—	—	—	RIAA: Gold	Non-album single
"Price of Fame"	2022	67	18	6	—	—	22	29	—	143	RIAA: Gold	Wasteland
"Fell in Love" (with Marshmello)	2023	—	—	—	96	—	—	—	—	—		Non-album single
"Moment of Your Life" (featuring Coco Jones)	2023	— (Note: "Moment of Your Life" did not enter the Billboard Hot 100, but peaked at number 10 on the Bubbling Under Hot 100 chart.)	36	8	—	—	17	—	—	—	RIAA: Gold	Larger than Life
"WY@"	2023	— (Note: "WY@" did not enter the Billboard Hot 100, but peaked at number 11 on the Bubbling Under Hot 100 chart.)	39	9	—	—	33	—	—	—	RIAA: Platinum	Larger than Life
"For Me" (Remix) (with Loe Shimmy)	2024	78	20	—	—	—	32	—	—	—	RIAA: Gold	Nardy World
"Peter Pan"	2025	—	—	—	—	—	22	—	—	—		Non-album singles
"Tony Soprano"	2025	— (Note: "Tony Soprano" did not enter the Billboard Hot 100, but peaked at number 21 on the Bubbling Under Hot 100 chart.)	—	—	—	—	15	—	—	—		Non-album singles
"Have To"	2025	51	12	—	—	—	22	—	—	—		Icon
"Bother Me" (with Tommy Richman)	2025	—	—	—	—	—	—	—	—	—		Worlds Apart
"Need It Bad" (with Ama)	2026	—	—	—	—	—	—	—	—	—		AMA
"—" denotes a recording that did not chart or was not released in that territory.

=== As featured artist ===
List of singles, showing year released and selected chart positions
Title	Year	Peak chart positions					Certifications	Album
Title	Year	US	US R&B/HH	CAN	NZ Hot	UK	Certifications	Album
"Crew" (GoldLink featuring Brent Faiyaz and Shy Glizzy)	2016	45	15	97	—	—	RIAA: 8× Platinum; BPI: Silver; RMNZ: 3× Platinum	At What Cost
"Language" (Paperboy Fabe featuring Brent Faiyaz)	2017	—	—	—	—	—	RIAA: Platinum; BPI: Silver; RMNZ: Platinum	Non-album single
"Trillions" (Alicia Keys featuring Brent Faiyaz)	2022	—	—	—	—	—		Keys II
"Don't Look at Numbers" (Remix) (Tony Shhnow featuring Brent Faiyaz)	2022	—	—	—	—	—		Non-album single
"Piece of My Heart" (Wizkid featuring Brent Faiyaz)	2024	—	—	—	13	61		Morayo
"—" denotes a recording that did not chart or was not released in that territory.

== Other charted and certified songs ==
List of songs, with selected chart positions and certifications, showing year released and album name
Title	Year	Peak chart positions									Certifications	Album
Title	Year	US	US R&B/HH	US R&B	CAN	IRE	NZ Hot	SA	UK	WW	Certifications	Album
"Gang Over Luv"	2017	—	—	—	—	—	—	—	—	—	RIAA: Platinum	Sonder Son
"Stay Down"	2017	—	—	—	—	—	—	—	—	—	RIAA: Gold	Sonder Son
"Talk 2 U"	2017	—	—	—	—	—	—	—	—	—	RIAA: Platinum; BPI: Silver; RMNZ: Gold	Sonder Son
"Make Luv"	2018	—	—	—	—	—	—	—	—	—	RIAA: Gold	Non-album singles
"Demonz (Interlude)" (Juice Wrld featuring Brent Faiyaz)	2019	— (Note: "Demonz (Interlude)" did not enter the Billboard Hot 100, but peaked at number 17 on the Billboard Bubbling Under Hot 100 chart.)	— (Note: "Demonz (Interlude)" did not enter the Hot R&B/Hip-Hop Songs chart, but peaked at number eight on the Billboard Bubbling Under R&B/Hip-Hop chart.)	—	—	—	—	—	—	—		Death Race for Love
"Clouded"	2020	—	—	—	—	—	—	—	—	—	RIAA: 4× Platinum; BPI: Gold; RMNZ: 2× Platinum	Fuck the World
"Been Away"	2020	—	—	—	—	—	—	—	—	—	RIAA: Platinum; BPI: Silver; RMNZ: Platinum	Fuck the World
"Let Me Know"	2020	—	—	—	—	—	—	—	—	—	RIAA: Gold	Fuck the World
"Sweet / I Thought You Wanted to Dance" (Tyler, The Creator featuring Brent Faiyaz and Fana Hues)	2021	60	27	—	61	—	—	—	—	62	RIAA: Platinum; RMNZ: Platinum	Call Me If You Get Lost
"Dreams, Fairytales, Fantasies" (ASAP Ferg featuring Salaam Remi and Brent Faiyaz)	2021	—	—	—	—	—	—	—	—	—	RIAA: Platinum; BPI: Gold; RMNZ: 2× Platinum	Floor Seats
"Lost Souls" (Baby Keem featuring Brent Faiyaz)	2021	—	—	—	—	—	24	—	—	—	RIAA: Platinum; RMNZ: Gold	The Melodic Blue
"Found" (Tems featuring Brent Faiyaz)	2021	—	—	—	—	—	—	—	—	—	RMNZ: Gold	If Orange Was a Place
"Villain's Theme"	2022	— (Note: "Villain's Theme" did not enter the Billboard Hot 100, but peaked at number four on the Bubbling Under Hot 100 chart.)	34	—	—	—	—	48	—	—		Wasteland
"Loose Change"	2022	52	13	5	80	84	1	8	72	81	RIAA: Gold	Wasteland
"Heal Your Heart (Interlude)"	2022	93	26	9	—	—	—	33	—	—		Wasteland
"All Mine"	2022	42	10	3	85	—	4	14	96	67	RIAA: 3× Platinum; BPI: Gold; RMNZ: Platinum	Wasteland
"Ghetto Gatsby" (featuring Alicia Keys)	2022	91	25	8	—	—	12	41	—	—		Wasteland
"Rolling Stone"	2022	84	23	7	—	—	—	19	—	—	RIAA: Platinum; RMNZ: Gold	Wasteland
"FYTB" (featuring Joony)	2022	97	28	10	—	—	—	50	—	—		Wasteland
"Addictions" (featuring Tre' Amani)	2022	— (Note: "Addictions" did not enter the Billboard Hot 100, but peaked at number two on the Bubbling Under Hot 100 chart.)	31	12	—	—	11	59	—	—	RIAA: Gold	Wasteland
"Role Model"	2022	— (Note: "Role Model" did not enter the Billboard Hot 100, but peaked at number 12 on the Bubbling Under Hot 100 chart.)	40	15	—	—	—	62	—	—	RIAA: Gold; BPI: Silver; RMNZ: Gold	Wasteland
"Jackie Brown"	2022	— (Note: "Jackie Brown" did not enter the Billboard Hot 100, but peaked at number eight on the Bubbling Under Hot 100 chart.)	34	14	—	—	—	60	96	—	RIAA: Platinum; BPI: Silver; RMNZ: Platinum	Wasteland
"Bad Luck"	2022	— (Note: "Bad Luck" did not enter the Billboard Hot 100, but peaked at number 16 on the Bubbling Under Hot 100 chart.)	42	17	—	—	—	77	—	—		Wasteland
"Tim's Intro"	2023	— (Note: "Tim's Intro" did not enter the Billboard Hot 100, but peaked at number 15 on the Bubbling Under Hot 100 chart.)	48	19	—	—	12	—	—	—		Larger than Life
"Last One Left" (featuring Lil Gray and Missy Elliott)	2023	— (Note: "Last One Left" did not enter the Billboard Hot 100, but peaked at number three on the Bubbling Under Hot 100 chart.)	31	11	—	—	11	—	—	—		Larger than Life
"Forever Yours"	2023	— (Note: "Forever Yours" did not enter the Billboard Hot 100, but peaked at number nine on the Bubbling Under Hot 100 chart.)	35	13	—	—	—	—	—	—	RIAA: Gold; RMNZ: Gold	Larger than Life
"Best Time"	2023	— (Note: "Best Time" did not enter the Billboard Hot 100, but peaked at number 13 on the Bubbling Under Hot 100 chart.)	41	16	—	—	10	—	89	—	RIAA: Platinum; BPI: Silver; RMNZ: Platinum	Larger than Life
"Outside All Night" (with N3WYRKLA and ASAP Rocky)	2023	— (Note: "Outside All Night" did not enter the Billboard Hot 100, but peaked at number one on the Bubbling Under Hot 100 chart.)	26	10	—	—	8	—	—	—	RIAA: Gold	Larger than Life
"Wherever I Go"	2023	— (Note: "Wherever I Go" did not enter the Billboard Hot 100, but peaked at number 23 on the Bubbling Under Hot 100 chart.)	—	22	—	—	—	—	—	—		Larger than Life
"Upset" (with Tommy Richman and Felix!)	2023	— (Note: "Upset" did not enter the Billboard Hot 100, but peaked at number seven on the Bubbling Under Hot 100 chart.)	33	12	—	—	—	—	—	—	RIAA: Gold; RMNZ: Gold	Larger than Life
"On This Side" (featuring A$AP Ant and Cruddy Murda)	2023	—	—	24	—	—	—	—	—	—		Larger than Life
"Belong to You" (featuring Babyface Ray)	2023	— (Note: "Belong to You" did not enter the Billboard Hot 100, but peaked at number 22 on the Bubbling Under Hot 100 chart.)	—	21	—	—	—	—	—	—		Larger than Life
"Pistachios"	2023	—	—	23	—	—	—	—	—	—		Larger than Life
"Should've Wore a Bonnet" (with 21 Savage)	2024	40	18	—	17	—	—	—	—	—	RIAA: Gold	American Dream
"Number One" (with Summer Walker)	2025	— (Note: "Number One" did not enter the Billboard Hot 100, but peaked at number 13 on the Bubbling Under Hot 100 chart.)	35	17	—	—	—	—	—	—		Finally Over It
"Stay Here 4 Life" (ASAP Rocky featuring Brent Faiyaz)	2026	23	7	—	33	—	2	—	49	34		Don't Be Dumb
"White Noise"	2026	— (Note: "White Noise" did not enter the Billboard Hot 100, but peaked at number 8 on the Bubbling Under Hot 100 chart.)	—	—	—	—	—	—	—	—		Icon
"Wrong Faces"	2026	54	13	—	92	—	13	—	96	195		Icon
"Butterflies"	2026	48	11	—	74	—	14	—	—	132	RIAA: Gold	Icon
"Other Side"	2026	60	16	—	96	—	12	—	95	—		Icon
"Strangers"	2026	88	31	—	—	—	20	—	—	—		Icon
"World Is Yours"	2026	— (Note: "World Is Yours" did not enter the Billboard Hot 100, but peaked at number 5 on the Bubbling Under Hot 100 chart.)	36	—	—	—	—	—	—	—		Icon
"Four Seasons"	2026	84	30	—	—	—	—	—	—	—		Icon
"Pure Fantasy"	2026	— (Note: "Pure Fantasy" did not enter the Billboard Hot 100, but peaked at number 11 on the Bubbling Under Hot 100 chart.)	47	—	—	—	—	—	—	—		Icon
"Vanilla Sky"	2026	— (Note: "Vanilla Sky" did not enter the Billboard Hot 100, but peaked at number 14 on the Bubbling Under Hot 100 chart.)	—	—	—	—	—	—	—	—		Icon
"1 for You (Spring in New York)"	2026	—	—	—	—	—	31	—	—	—		Icon (Director's Cut)
"Like It Was"	2026	—	—	—	—	—	39	—	—	—		Icon (Director's Cut)
"—" denotes a recording that did not chart or was not released in that territory.

== Other guest appearances ==
List of other non-single guest appearances, with other performing artists, showing year released and album name
Title	Year	Other performer(s)	Album
"City Lights"	2014	Axron	Lxtenights
"Insecure"	2016	Stwo, Atu	D.T.S.N.T. EP
"Swish / Use 2"	2019	FLEE, StoopidXool	Xool Summer
"On Us"	2020	Tre' Amani, Lost Kids	Thanks for Nothing
"Feel a Way"	2020	2 Chainz, Kanye West	So Help Me God!
"Swangin"	2020	E-40, Too Short	Ain’t Gone Do It / Terms and Conditions
"Halo"	2021	Meek Mill	Expensive Pain
"Bus Stop"	2023	Don Toliver	Love Sick
"For Me"	2024	Loe Shimmy	Nardy World
"Number One"	2025	Summer Walker	Finally Over It
