= Do Not Listen =

EP by Brent Faiyaz
- Released: February 8, 2021
- Genre: R&B
- Length: 14:07
- Label: Lost Kids
- Producer: Brent Faiyaz; Coop The Truth; L3GION; Lil Rece; Nascent; Sam Wish

Brent Faiyaz chronology
| Fuck the World (2020) | Do Not Listen (2021) | Wasteland (2022) |

Do Not Listen is the sixth extended play (EP) by American R&B singer Brent Faiyaz released on February 8, 2021 through Lost Kids. Consisting of three tracks and a duration of around fourteen minutes, production is handled by multiple record producers including Faiyaz himself. The EP was co-written by Faiyaz after the release of his fourth EP, Fuck the World (2020).

== Background and composition ==
In February 2020, Brent Faiyaz released his fourth EP, Fuck the World through Lost Kids. It would debut at number twenty on the US Billboard 200 chart, advancing around 30,000 album-equivalent units. Fuck the World received generally favorable reviews from critics. On January 29, 2021, Faiyaz collaborated with DJ Dahi and Tyler, The Creator on "Gravity", which later gained critical acclaim. Faiyaz would later surprise-release the project on February 8, 2021, through a Dropbox link on his Twitter, writing "DO NOT LISTEN". A music video for "Circles", filmed by Zhamak Fullad was released concurrently. The EP also cointains the original version of Price Of Fame". "Circles" samples Purr's "Hard to Realize". Pitchfork's Brandon Callender wrote that "Circles" consisted of "biting string plucks". Do Not Listen is 14 minutes and 7 seconds long.

== Critical reception ==
Rated R&B's Antwane Folk felt that "Circles" features pitched vocal shifts "pulling from all directions". Folk said "Paper Soldiers,” was "a nonchalant trap anthem."

== Track listing ==
| No. | Title | Writer(s) | Producer(s) | Length |
|---|---|---|---|---|
| 1. | "Circles" (featuring Purr) | Cristopher Wood; Avalos Elmer; Coop The Truth; Eliza Barry Callahan^{[a]}; Jack Staffen^{[a]} | L.3.G.I.O.N.; Coop The Truth | 3:46 |
| 2. | "Paper Soldier" | Wood; Elmer | L.3.G.I.O.N.; Wood | 4:02 |
| 3. | "Price of Fame" | Wood; Elmer; Sam Wishkoski; Jacob Dutton | Wood; Elmer; Jake One; Sam Wish; Nascent | 6:19 |
| Total length: | | | | 14:07 |

Sample and interpolation credits

- ^{^[a]} "Circles" contains a sample from "Hard to Realize", written by Eliza Barry Callahan and Jack Staffen, as performed by Purr.
