= Fell in Love (Marshmello song) =

Single by Marshmello and Brent Faiyaz
- Released: May 5, 2023
- Genre: R&B
- Length: 2:01
- Label: Joytime Collective; Lost Kids
- Songwriters: Jeremy Malvin; Christopher Wood
- Producers: Marshmello; Chrome Sparks

Marshmello singles chronology
"Esta Vida" (2023)	"Fell in Love" (2023)	"GBG" (2023)

Brent Faiyaz singles chronology
"Price of Fame" (2022)	"Fell In Love" (2023)	"Moment of Your Life" (2023)

Music video
- "Fell In Love" on YouTube

"Fell In Love" is a song by the American DJ Marshmello and American R&B singer Brent Faiyaz. It was released on May 5, 2023, through Joytime Collective and Lost Kids. The song was written by Faiyaz, Chrome Sparks, and Marshmello, with Comstock handling the production and Malvin serving as a co-producer. While its lyrics describe a toxic relationship where one partner seeks their significant other to stay the version they're comfortable with. "Fell in Love" has been described as an R&B and hip-hop track, that incorporates layered bass and percussions in its production. A music video directed by Christian Breslauer premiered alongside the song's release and depicts Faiyaz driving into the woods.

Upon its release, "Fell in Love" had received generally favorable reviews from music critics, who praised its production and Faiyaz's vocals. "Fell in Love" was a commercial success. The song had peaked at number 96 on the Billboard Canadian Hot 100 and at number ten on the Billboard Bubbling Under Hot 100 charts, in addition to reaching the top ten in New Zealand.

== Background and release ==
In the beginning of the music video, Faiyaz is seen driving a car into the woods.

Brent Faiyaz released his second studio album Wasteland in 2022, which was subsequently named one of The Fader's best albums of the year. Following the announcement of his Fuck The World, It's a Wasteland world tour, Faiyaz had later announced his new partnership with UnitedMasters. "Fell in Love" was teased by Marshmello and Faiyaz on social media with a 17-second video of the latter laughing with the actress from the music video. Marshmello and Chrome Sparks would handle the production for the song.

=== Music video ===
Christian Breslauer had directed the music video for "Fell in Love", which premiered on the same day as the song's release. The video starts with Faiyaz driving into the woods. He converses and smokes while in the car. The video also depicts Faiyaz with multiple girls.

== Production and composition ==
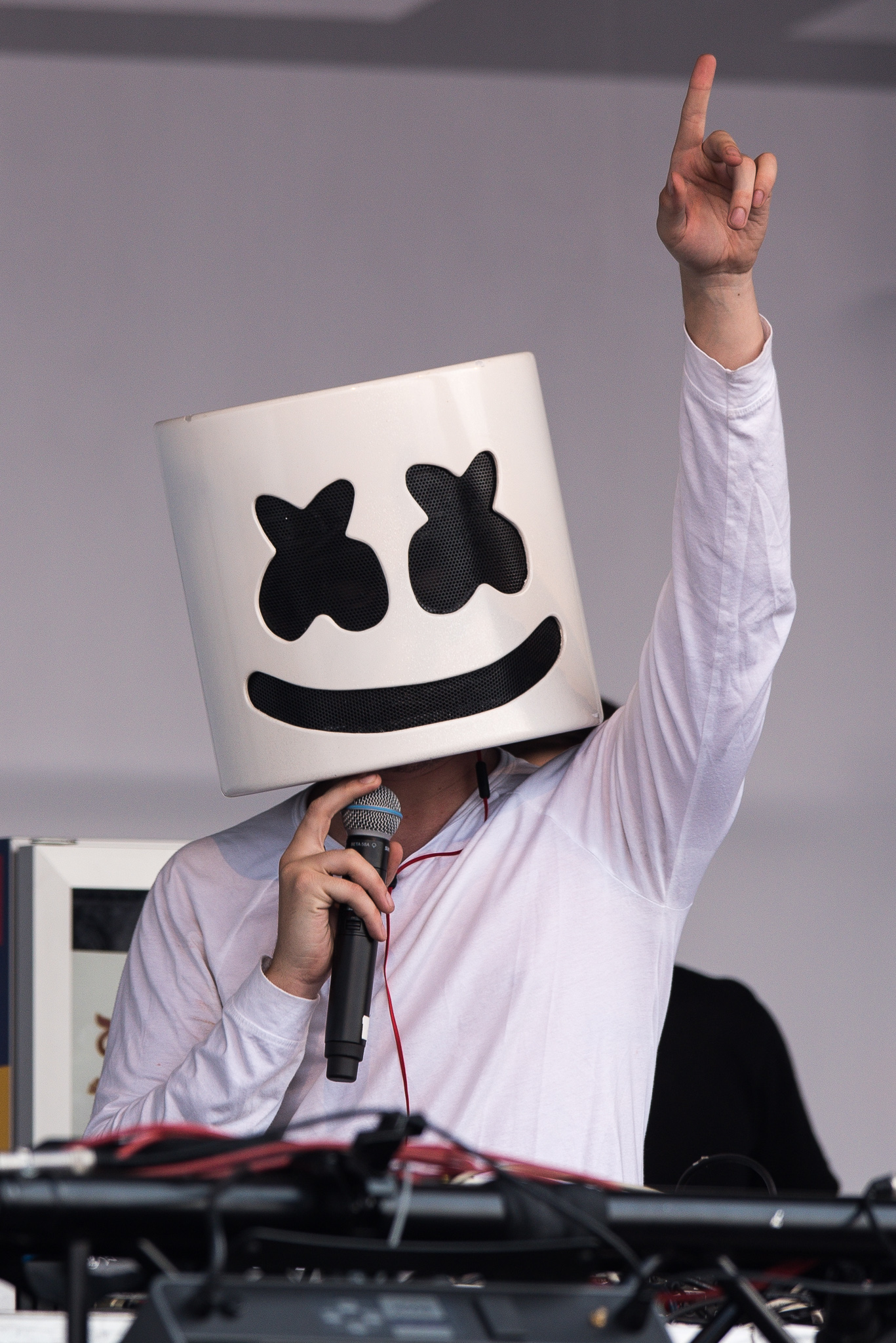
Marshmello handled the production for the song, alongside Chrome Sparks

"Fell in Love"
A 24-second sample of "Fell in Love", an R&B and hip-hop song, featuring a rolling and percussive beat and Faiyaz's crooning vocals in the second verse.

Faiyaz wrote "Fell in Love" alongside its producers and engineers, Marshmello and Chrome Sparks. "Fell in Love" is 2 minutes and 1 second long. "Fell in Love" is set in common time at a tempo of 150 beats per minute. The song is composed in the key of C major. It is an R&B song that incorporates elements of hip-hop, electronic, and pop. The song progresses with a "wavy", "rolling", and "percussive" beat. Nmesoma Okechukwu of Euphoria Magazine had described "Fell In Love" as a "laid-back track with elements of hip-hop and R&B." The lyrics of "Fell in Love" reclaim Faiyaz singing about a toxic relationship where a partner seeks their partner to stay the version of them they're more comfortable falling in love with, and their partner's misconceptions about them.

== Commercial performance ==
"Fell in Love" entered at number 10 on the US Billboard Bubbling Under Hot 100 and maintained its position for two weeks, while it peaked at 96 on the Billboard Canadian Hot 100 chart. On the Billboard Hot R&B/Hip-Hop Songs chart, however, the song peaked at number 33 for a week, and then later dropped down to 38 the next week. During the week of May 17, 2023, "Fell In Love" peaked at number 13 on the Billboard Hot R&B Songs chart. On the New Zealand Hot Singles chart, it debuted at number 9, spending one week in the top 40.

== Critical reception ==
"Fell In Love" received generally favorable reviews from music critics. According to David Renshaw at The Fader, the track is "a straightforward summer groove, with Faiyaz taking the opportunity to settle the score following the breakdown of a relationship." While Alex Gonzalez writing for Uproxx felt that "Fell in Love" had a simple "rolling" and "percussive" beat. HotNewHipHop's Gabriel Bras Nevares wrote that the song was "wavy" and said it had a "plucky bass", with "breezy vocal harmonies", and a feeling leaning towards "electronic" by way of the Marshmello's contributions, feeling Faiyaz "shines as a crooner and storyteller." Meanwhile Mateo Braxton writing for Our Generation Music said Faiyaz's "silky-smooth singing" had perfectly complimented Marshmello's "signature production". James Jones of HotNewHipHop wrote that it was a "bouncy" track that has listeners reminiscing about the late '90s and early '00s R&B. While Caleb Hardy of the same publication felt that while the track's "heavy 808s and snare hits" resembled a pop song, it contained "subtle elements of electronic music" with the use of synths".

== Live performances ==
Faiyaz would perform "Fell in Love" at his Eventim Apollo concert in London. Which was later streamed as an Apple Music Live exclusive on November 29, 2023. In a press release, he would state: "We had a time on the road. Thank you Apple Music for allowing me to bring the F–k the World It's a Wasteland Tour experience to millions. Hope you enjoy the show."

== Formats and track listings ==
Digital download
No.	Title	Length
1.	"Fell in Love"	2:01

Digital download – live version
No.	Title	Length
1.	"Fell in Love (Live)"	1:50

== Charts ==
=== Weekly charts ===
Weekly chart performance for "Fell in Love"
Chart (2023)	Peak position
Canada Hot 100 (Billboard)	96
New Zealand Hot Singles (RMNZ)	9
US Bubbling Under Hot 100 (Billboard)	10
US Hot R&B/Hip-Hop Songs (Billboard)	33
US Hot R&B Songs (Billboard)	13

== Release history ==
List of release dates, release format(s), version(s), label(s) and reference(s)
Region	Date	Format(s)	Version(s)	Label(s)	Ref.
Various	May 5, 2023	Digital download; streaming	Original	ISO Supremacy; UnitedMasters	
Various	November 29, 2023	Digital download; streaming	Live	ISO Supremacy; UnitedMasters	
