= Nascent (record producer) =

American producer, songwriter

- Born: Christopher Ruelas; Chicago, Illinois, United States
- Occupations: Producer; songwriter
- Years active: 2009–present
- Musical career
- Genres: R&B; pop; hip-hop

Christopher Ruelas, known professionally as Nascent, is an American record producer and songwriter best known for producing and co-writing SZA's "Good Days" and the Kanye West / The Weeknd collaboration "Hurricane.".

== Career ==
=== Early life ===
Ruelas began to show an interest in producing music in his early teens using software Acid Pro, before giving away beats for free to any Chicago musicians looking for music to spread word of mouth of his productions. After graduating high school, temporarily moving to New York, and watching a G-Unit documentary, Ruelas decided to go to the G-Unit Records offices and drop off a disc of beats he produced. An on-site A&R played his music on the spot, and he received his first placement at 18: "Strong Enough" from 50 Cent's 2009 album Before I Self Destruct. Recognition from this opportunity grew into burgeoning relationships with local Chicago artists Chance The Rapper, Saba, and Mick Jenkins once he returned to the city.

=== Music career ===
In 2018, Ruelas was invited to a session with old friend Chance The Rapper to create songs for a Kanye West joint-project (then-named Good Ass Job), and one of the productions they created would come out three years later as top 10 single "Hurricane" on his project Donda. In 2020, three years after Ruelas built on a voice note of fellow producer Los Hendrix's guitar riff with his own drums and sent it to Carter Lang, SZA heard the production and instantly began writing to it, building "Good Days," her first solo top 10 hit on the Billboard Hot 100 Chart.

In 2024, Ruelas released his project Don't Grow Up Too Soon.

== Discography ==
=== Studio albums ===
Minus The Bullshit Life's Great	Released: 14 May 2021; Label: Don't Grow Up Too Soon; Format: Digital download, streaming
Don't Grow Up Too Soon	Released: 26 April 2024; Label: Don't Grow Up Too Soon/COLTURE; Format: Digital download, streaming

=== Selected production / songwriting credits ===
Title	Year	Artist	Album
"Strong Enough"	2009	50 Cent	Before I Self Destruct
"Flip On You" (featuring Schoolboy Q)	2014	50 Cent	Animal Ambition
"Still Fucked Up"	2014	G Herbo	Welcome to Fazoland
"Gang Over Luv"	2017	Brent Faiyaz	Sonder Son
"First World Problemz/Nobody Carez"	2017	Brent Faiyaz	Sonder Son
"Stay Down"	2017	Brent Faiyaz	Sonder Son
"Why'z it so hard"	2018	Brent Faiyaz	Lost
"Trust"	2018	Brent Faiyaz	Lost
"Voices in My Head"	2018	A Boogie wit da Hoodie	Hoodie SZN
"Hero"	2019	Pivot Gang	You Can't Sit with Us
"Daddy Knows" (featuring Ash Leone)	2019	Dave East	Survival
"Good Days"	2020	SZA	SOS
"Clouded"	2020	Brent Faiyaz	Fuck the World
"Been Away"	2020	Brent Faiyaz	Fuck the World
"Ladylike"	2020	Kiana Ledé	Kiki
"Hurricane" (with The Weeknd)	2021	Kanye West	Donda
"Price of Fame"	2021	Brent Faiyaz	Do Not Listen
"Price of Fame"	2022	Brent Faiyaz	Wasteland
"Rolling Stone"	2022	Brent Faiyaz	Wasteland
"2012" (featuring Day Wave)	2022	Saba	Few Good Things
"Afro Futurism"	2023	Noname	Sundial

== Awards and nominations ==
Year	Ceremony	Award	Result	Ref
2022	64th Annual Grammy Awards	Best R&B Song ("Good Days")	Nominated	
2022	64th Annual Grammy Awards	Album of the Year (Donda)	Nominated	
