= Los Hendrix =

American record producer, songwriter

- Born: Carlos Daniel Muñoz; New York City, NY
- Occupations: Record producer; songwriter
- Years active: 2015–present
- Musical career
- Genres: R&B; pop; hip-hop

Carlos Daniel Muñoz, known professionally as Los Hendrix, is an American record producer and songwriter, best known for co-producing and co-writing "Good Days," the top 10 lead single from SZA's album SOS.

== Career ==
=== Early life ===
Growing up in a Puerto Rican and Cuban household, Muñoz' family would regularly play artists like Celia Cruz and Gloria Estefan, on top of soul-rooted music like The Temptations and The Stylistics. Muñoz would later discover Notorious B.I.G. and Jimi Hendrix, among others.

=== Music career ===
Muñoz began working with GOOD Music early in his career, and counts producer Che Pope as a mentor. This evolved into finding a young Brent Faiyaz and helping to develop his sound. In 2017, Muñoz began crafting a bright-sounding song built around a "lush" guitar riff, and sent it to a friend: fellow producer Nascent. After drums were added, the producers sent the song to Carter Lang, who kept the production until his next session with SZA. As soon as SZA heard the song, she began to write something hopeful to match the production. The final product, "Good Days," became her first solo top 10 hit on the Billboard Hot 100 Chart.

== Discography ==
=== Selected production / songwriting credits ===
Title	Year	Artist	Album
"Poison"	2016	Brent Faiyaz	A. M. Paradox
"Burn One (Interlude)"	2017	Brent Faiyaz	Sonder Son
"First World Problemz/Nobody Carez"	2017	Brent Faiyaz	Sonder Son
"Missing Out"	2017	Brent Faiyaz	Sonder Son
"Stay Down"	2017	Brent Faiyaz	Sonder Son
"Talk 2 U"	2017	Brent Faiyaz	Sonder Son
"Sonder Son (Interlude)"	2017	Brent Faiyaz	Sonder Son
"Came Right Back"	2018	Brent Faiyaz	Lost
"Trust"	2018	Brent Faiyaz	Lost
"Target On My Chest"	2018	Brent Faiyaz	Lost
"Casual"	2018	Doja Cat	Amala
"Good Days"	2020	SZA	SOS
"Clouded"	2020	Brent Faiyaz	Fuck the World
"Been Away"	2020	Brent Faiyaz	Fuck the World
"Let Me Know"	2020	Brent Faiyaz	Fuck the World
"Make It Out"	2020	Brent Faiyaz	Fuck the World
"The Beach"	2020	Giveon	Take Time
"This Ain't Love"	2020	Giveon	Take Time
"Like I Want You"	2020	Giveon	Take Time
"Ladylike"	2020	Kiana Ledé	Kiki
"24.19"	2020	Childish Gambino	3.15.20
"Walk Em Down" (featuring Roddy Ricch)	2020	NLE Choppa	Top Shotta
"Everybody Business"	2020	Kehlani	It Was Good Until It Wasn't
"Open (Passionate)"	2020	Kehlani	It Was Good Until It Wasn't
"Drugs n Hella Melodies" (featuring Kali Uchis)	2021	Don Toliver	Life of a Don
"Bad Luck"	2022	Brent Faiyaz	Wasteland
"Far"	2022	SZA	SOS
"Jumpin" (featuring Polo G)	2022	NLE Choppa	Me vs. Me
"LoveSickness"	2023	Don Toliver	Love Sick
"Leather Coat"	2023	Don Toliver	Love Sick
"Company Pt. 3"	2023	Don Toliver	Love Sick
"Six Shots"	2023	Sam Smith	Gloria
"Backstreets" (featuring Teezo Touchdown)	2024	Don Toliver	Hardstone Psycho
"Sweet Thang" (featuring Summer Walker)	2024	Childish Gambino	Atavista
"I Can Tell"	2025	Giveon	Beloved
"Jezebel"	2025	Giveon	Beloved
"Fool Me Once" (featuring Leon Thomas)	2025	Giveon	Beloved
"Keeper" (featuring Teddy Swims)	2025	Giveon	Beloved
"Feel It on Me"	2025	Jessie J	Don't Tease Me with a Good Time
"I Don't Care"	2025	Jessie J	Don't Tease Me with a Good Time
"No Secrets"	2025	Jessie J	Don't Tease Me with a Good Time
"If I Save You"	2025	Jessie J	Don't Tease Me with a Good Time
"Believe in Magic / Joy (Interlude)"	2025	Jessie J	Don't Tease Me with a Good Time
"Colourful"	2025	Jessie J	Don't Tease Me with a Good Time
"Stand for Something"	2026	Dahi	Black Boy (Alternative)

== Awards and nominations ==
Year	Ceremony	Award	Result	Ref
2022	64th Annual Grammy Awards	Best R&B Song ("Good Days")	Nominated	
