= Loose Change (Brent Faiyaz song) =

2022 song by Brent Faiyaz

Song by Brent Faiyaz

from the album Wasteland
- Released: July 8, 2022
- Length: 3:47
- Label: Lost Kids; Venice; Stem
- Songwriters: Christopher Wood; Eliot Dubock; Dion Wilson; Fabbien Nahounou; Raphael Saadiq; Jordan Ware; Terius Nash
- Producers: Brent Faiyaz; Beat Butcha; No I.D.; Paperboy Fabe; Raphael Saadiq; Jordan Ware

Music video
- "Loose Change" on YouTube

"Loose Change" (stylized in all caps) is a song by American R&B singer Brent Faiyaz and the second track from his second studio album, Wasteland (2022). It was produced by Faiyaz, Beat Butcha, No I.D., Paperboy Fabe, Raphael Saadiq, and Jordan Ware.

== Composition ==
Clash's Robin Murray wrote that the song's arrangement is "somehow both gloriously languid and ultra-minimalist". Writing for HipHopDX, David Aaron Brake wrote that the song is "backed by piercing strings" and "includes nearly no drums and sets aside hallmarks of traditional song structure for something more organic and amorphous". The New York Times' Jon Caramanica stated that "there are urgent punches of strings" on the song.

== Critical reception ==
Writing for Clash, Robin Murray stated that the track is "truly beautiful". HipHopDX's David Aaron Brake stated that the track "flourishes through the DMV singer’s delicate voice, altered to sway between a crisp bite and a haunted distortion". While referring to "Loose Change", Pitchfork's Dani Blum stated that "Faiyaz is at his best when he leans into disorientation, dissecting and conveying it".

== Music video ==
The Lone Wolf and Mark Peaced-directed music video was released months after the song's release on September 9, 2022. The video is described as a "stylish black-and-white visual" that includes flashes of Ballet, featuring a guest appearance from the Olympic gymnast, Nastasya Generalova.

== Charts ==
Chart performance for "Loose Change"
Chart (2022)	Peak position
Canada Hot 100 (Billboard)	80
Global 200 (Billboard)	81
Ireland (IRMA)	84
New Zealand Hot Singles (RMNZ)	1
South Africa Streaming (TOSAC)	8
UK Singles (OCC)	72
US Billboard Hot 100	52
US Hot R&B/Hip-Hop Songs (Billboard)	13
