= Mercedes (Brent Faiyaz song) =

2021 single by Brent Faiyaz

Single by Brent Faiyaz
- Released: December 3, 2021
- Genre: R&B
- Length: 3:53
- Label: Lost Kids; Stem
- Songwriters: Christopher Wood; Atupele Ndisale; Andrew Aged; Daniel Aged; Atupele Ndisale; Terius Nash
- Producers: Brent Faiyaz; Atu

Brent Faiyaz singles chronology
"Wasting Time" (2021)	"Mercedes" (2021)	"Price of Fame" (2022)

"Mercedes" is a song by American R&B singer Brent Faiyaz. It was released on December 3, 2021 through Lost Kids and Stem Disintermedia. It was produced by Faiyaz himself, accompanied by Atu. "Mercedes" would peak at number 98 on the Billboard Hot 100 chart and number 32 on the US Billboard Hot R&B/Hip-Hop Songs chart. Its lyrics center around Faiyaz addressing a woman who is quickly infatuated with him.

== Background and composition ==
Following his collaboration with Tyler, the Creator and DJ Dahi on "Gravity", he would release "Mercedes". In the song, Faiyaz addresses a woman who is quickly infatuated with him. He warns her to think twice before pursuing a romantic relationship with him, and about its potential consequences, suspecting that she only wants to enter a relationship for the superficial benefits.

== Critical reception ==
Jordan Darville writing for The Fader had felt the song was "brooding", and "gently psychedelic". While Neena Rouhani and Cydney Lee from Billboard wrote "carries ’90s elements and busy synth instrumentation, somehow leaving enough room for Faiyaz’s distinctive harmonies and ad-libs." Also writing "As the R&B crooner warns hopeful women against pursuing him, we can’t help but think that the smooth singer’s velvety vocals and effortless appeal is only convincing them otherwise."

== Charts ==
Chart performance for "Mercedes"
Chart (2021)	Peak position
New Zealand Hot Singles (RMNZ)	25
US Billboard Hot 100	98
US Hot R&B/Hip-Hop Songs (Billboard)	32

== Certifications ==
Region	Certification	Certified units/sales
United States (RIAA)	Gold	500,000^{‡}
^{‡} Sales+streaming figures based on certification alone.
