= A. M. Paradox =

A.M. Paradox

EP by Brent Faiyaz
- Released: September 19, 2016
- Genre: R&B
- Length: 21:48
- Label: Lost Kids
- Producer: Atu; Ben Free; Dpat; James Harte; Los Hendrix; Pablo Dylan; Paperboy Fabe

Brent Faiyaz chronology
Black Child EP (2013)	A.M. Paradox (2016)	Sonder Son (2017)

Singles from A. M. Paradox
- 1. "Invite Me" Released: June 1, 2016; 2. "Poison" Released: September 15, 2016

A.M. Paradox is the second extended play (EP) by American singer-songwriter and rapper Brent Faiyaz. It released on September 19, 2016 through Lost Kids as a follow up to his debut EP, Black Child. Consisting of five tracks and a duration of around twenty-one minutes, its production was handled by multiple record producers including Ben Free, Los Hendrix and Pablo Dylan.

A.M. Paradox is an R&B EP that explores themes of lust, love and loss. The EP was promoted with the two singles "Poison" and "Invite Me". Upon release, it would receive generally positive reviews from music critics.

== Background and release ==
Faiyaz would sign a publishing deal with Pulse Music Group. On June 1, 2016, He would release the lead single "Invite Me". Upon working on the album, producer Ben Free took Faiyaz through a rough idea for a song called “Poison.” Faiyaz explained that the song "pushed him creatively and challenged him both vocally and conceptually outside his comfort zone." He'd later release "Poison" as the second and final single on September 15, 2016. Upon its release on September 19, 2016, it gained traction, and received generally positive reviews from music critics.

== Composition ==
According to Vice's Kwele Serrell, A.M. Paradox's lead single "Poison" has an "immensely sexy vibe that almost forces you to get lost in a deep hole of provocative feelings and fantasies. This may or may not stimulate awkward emotions in the workplace."

== Critical reception ==
Writing for Pigeons and Planes, Jon Tanners wrote the EP "arrives result of so much searching and personal evolution—a pointed, polished continuation of the hushed, sultry explorations of love and lust that first put Faiyaz onto our radar. A.M. Paradox takes root in Faiyaz's mission for honest expression."

== Track listing ==
No.	Title	Producer(s)	Length
1.	"Lovely"	Dpat; Atu	4:51
2.	"Insecure"	James Harte; Pablo Dylan	4:05
3.	"Invite Me"	Dylan	3:14
4.	"Poison"	Ben Free; Los Hendrix	5:05
5.	"No One Knows"	Sonder; Paperboy Fabe	4:31
Total length:			21:48
