= All Mine =

All Mine may refer to:

- "All Mine" (Brent Faiyaz song), 2022
- "All Mine" (f(x) song), 2016
- "All Mine" (Kanye West song), 2018
- "All Mine" (Portishead song), 1997
- "All Mine", a song by Kali Uchis from the album Red Moon in Venus, 2023
