= Need It Bad =

Song by Ama featuring Brent Faiyaz
- Released: March 6, 2026
- Genre: R&B
- Length: 3:07
- Label: ISO Supremacy; PULSE Records
- Producers: Mannyvelli; Ama; SpizzleDoe

Ama chronology
"My Girl" (2025)	"Need It Bad" (2026)

Brent Faiyaz singles chronology
"Bother Me" (2025)	"Need It Bad" (2026)

Music video
- "Need it Bad" on YouTube

"Need It Bad" is a single by British singer-songwriter Ama featuring American R&B singer Brent Faiyaz. It was released on March 6, 2026, through ISO Supremacy and Pulse Records. The song was written by Faiyaz, Ama, Mannyvelli, SpizzleDoe, with the former handling the production and the latter serving as a co-producer. The song's lyrics describes two significant others and how much they miss each other. A music video directed by Micaiah Carter premiered alongside the song's release and depicts two love interests yearning for a connection until space and time ultimately bring them together.

== Background and release ==
Brent Faiyaz released his third studio album, Icon, through ISO Supremacy and UnitedMasters in February 2026. The album peaked at number six on the Billboard 200, advancing around 42,000 album-equivalent units within its first two weeks. Icon had received mixed and generally positive reviews from critics who highlighted Faiyaz's vocal versatility.

== Production and composition ==
Faiyaz wrote "Need It Bad" alongside Ama and the song's producers and engineers, Mannyvelli and SpizzleDoe. "Need it Bad" is 3 minutes and 7 seconds long. The Garnette Report's Vincent Lane had called it a contemporary R&B song with "layered" and "atmospheric" production. The lyrics of "Need It Bad" follow Faiyaz singing about a girl that he met, and how much he misses her.

== Critical reception ==
Melodic Magazine's Sanjeev Wignarajah commented on Faiyaz's vocals saying that they were "smooth" and "accompanied by 808s". While Michael Saponara at Billboard said "The British singer tangos with Brent Faiyaz for the seductive "Need It Bad." [...] explaining that the two "trade sultry verses". HotNewHipHop's Alexander Cole wrote that the song was "the perfect collaboration" between the two, and said that it started with a "phenomenal" verse from Faiyaz that later progressed into a "sensual performance" from Ama.

== Credits and personnel ==
Credits adapted from Tidal.

- Brent Faiyaz – vocals, songwriting, production
- Ama – vocals, songwriting
- SpizzleDoe – songwriting, production
- Mannyvelli – production
- James Mellor – recording, mixing
- Paniik – recording
- Itai Schwartz – engineering, mastering
