= Dead Man Walking (Brent Faiyaz song) =

2020 single by Brent Faiyaz

Single by Brent Faiyaz

from the album Wasteland
- Released: September 18, 2020
- Genre: R&B
- Length: 4:08
- Label: Lost Kids; Venice; Stem
- Songwriters: Christopher Wood; Sharif Jenkins; Maurice E. Willis; David Patino; Jordan Ware
- Producers: Brent Faiyaz; Lil Rece; Dpat; Jordan Ware

Brent Faiyaz singles chronology
"Rehab (Winter in Paris)" (2019)	"Dead Man Walking" (2020)	"Gravity" (2021)

Audio video
- "Dead Man Walking" on YouTube

"Dead Man Walking" is a song by the American musician Brent Faiyaz. It was released on September 18, 2020 through Lost Kids, Venice Music, and Stem Disintermedia as the lead single from his sophomore studio album Wasteland (2022). The song was written by Faiyaz and Maurice E. Willis alongside its co-producers, Lil Rece, Dpat, and Jordan Ware.

Upon its release, "Dead Man Walking" was met with generally positive reviews from music critics. Commercially, it would claim a top ten placement among multiple charts including the Billboard Bubbling Under Hot 100. It would peak at number 43 on the Hot R&B/Hip-Hop Songs chart and receive a 3× platinum certification by the Recording Industry Association of America (RIAA). While also placing within the top twenty in markets such as the United Kingdom.

== Background and release ==
In 2020, Faiyaz released his fourth extended play (EP) Fuck The World, and started working on material for a new album. Shortly after the EP's release, "Dead Man Walking" was released through Lost Kids, Venice Music, and Stem Disintermedia as the lead single from his sophomore studio album Wasteland (2022). It would later gain virality on the social media platform TikTok. In an interview with Business Insider, Faiyaz stated that: "While I'm here and I'm making music and I'm working on music in the midst of all this shit going on, let me make a record about making music in the midst of all this shit going on."

== Composition ==
"Dead Man Walking" is an R&B song with a duration of about four minutes and eight seconds. The song was written by Faiyaz and Maurice E. Willis alongside record producers Lil Rece, Dpat, and Jordan Ware. Pitchfork's Dani Blud wrote that "the hazy thrill" of the song shoved listeners "back into the overwrought narrative before any of the hits can metabolize". The song's lyrics center around living life carefree, while also providing a philosophy of Faiyaz's life.

== Commercial performance ==
Commercially, the song peaked at number six on the Billboard Bubbling Under Hot 100 chart, and had also appeared on the U.S. Hot R&B/Hip-Hop Songs chart. It also peaked at number eight on the singles chart of Ireland, and appeared on UK Singles and the UK Indie chart. The Recording Industry Association of America (RIAA) had certified "Dead Man Walking" as Gold for selling 500,000 units on June 9, 2021, later being certified Platinum on December 8, 2022, 2× Platinum on September 18, 2023, and 3× Platinum on July 3, 2025. In England, the song was certified Gold by the British Phonographic Industry (BPI) for selling 200,000 units on June 27, 2025, which was previously certified Silver three years prior. In New Zealand, Recorded Music NZ (RMNZ) certified it as Platinum for selling 30,000 units on March 30, 2023. It was previously certified Gold a year and a half prior.

== Critical reception ==
Clash's Robin Murray wrote that the song "find[s] Brent daring to pull down the curtain of hype that surrounds him, and let fans see a little extra from his world". Writing for Pitchfork, Dani Blud described it as a track which "distilled a fledgling philosophy for the next quarter of his life". Andy Kellman of AllMusic felt the song "uncoils as a stamping, swirling reflection on submitting to temptation", while Kalen Murphy of Earmilk wrote "The high-end production paired with Faiyaz's euphoric voice gives the track the same effortless swagger he delivers his verses with."

== Live performances ==
In November 2023, Faiyaz had performed "Dead Man Walking" at his Eventim Apollo concert in London. The concert was later streamed as an hour long Apple Music exclusive a few days later. In January 2024, he performed the song at the New Frontier Theater in Manila, Philippines.

== Credits and personnel ==
Credits adapted from Tidal.

- Brent Faiyaz – vocals, songwriting, production
- Maurice E. Willis – songwriting
- David Patino – songwriting, production
- Lil Rece – songwriting, production
- Jordan Ware – songwriting, production

== Charts ==
=== Weekly charts ===
Chart (2020)	Peak position
Ireland (IRMA)	8
UK Singles (Official Charts)	85
UK Indie (Official Charts)	18
US Bubbling Under Hot 100 Singles (Billboard)	6
US Hot R&B/Hip-Hop Songs (Billboard)	43

== Certifications and sales ==
Region	Certification	Certified units/sales
New Zealand (RMNZ)	Platinum	30,000^{‡}
United Kingdom (BPI)	Silver	200,000^{‡}
United States (RIAA)	3× Platinum	3,000,000^{‡}
^{‡} Sales+streaming figures based on certification alone.

== Release history ==
List of release dates, release format(s), version(s), label(s) and reference(s)
Region	Date	Format(s)	Version(s)	Label(s)	Ref.
Various	September 18, 2020	Digital download; streaming	Original	Lost Kids; Venice; Stem	
Various	November 29, 2023	Digital download; streaming	Live	ISO Supremacy; UnitedMasters	
