= Jackie Brown (song) =

Song by Brent Faiyaz

from the album Wasteland
- Released: July 8, 2022
- Genre: R&B
- Length: 2:49
- Label: Lost Kids; Venice; Stem
- Songwriters: Christopher Wood; Jason Avalos
- Producers: Brent Faiyaz; L.3.G.I.O.N.; Jordan Ware

Music video
- "Jackie Brown" on YouTube

"Jackie Brown" (stylized in all caps) is a song by American R&B singer Brent Faiyaz released as the sixteenth track from his second studio album, Wasteland (2022). It was produced by Brent Faiyaz, L.3.G.I.O.N. and Jordan Ware. The song would peak at number 8 on the Billboard Bubbling Under Hot 100 chart and receive a platinum certification from the Recording Industry Association of America (RIAA).

== Background and composition ==
In an interview with Variety's Alex Gonzalez, Faiyaz stated: “Jackie Brown was one of the movies I was watching during COVID on repeat. Besides the fact that Pam Grier was fine as sh-t in that movie, I also liked the fact that they stay by the beach in L.A., and I stay in Venice, [...] “Cinematically, I liked the shots and I liked the colors. For whatever reason, when I watch Tarantino films, it just makes me want to make music. Something about the images just puts sounds in my head. Tarantino’s the GOAT. Cold as f–k.” "Jackie Brown" is 2 minutes and 49 seconds long. Jon Caramanica writing for The New York Times felt it had "new wave shimmers".

== Music video ==
Faiyaz inside an airplane, mirroring opening scenes of the Jackie Brown (1997) film.

Mark Peaced and Lone Wolf would direct the music video for "Jackie Brown", which premiered on August 16, 2023. The song's music video was inspired by Quentin Tarantino's 1997 crime drama of the same name. The video opens with Faiyaz on a plane, cruising and snoozing through the clouds. Also depicts filled with yacht rides with a woman on either side of him to custom-tailored suits to endless glasses of champagne, and wealth that can’t buy his leading lady. Writing for Okayplayer, Jaelani Williams wrote "Brent Faiyaz brings the 1990s to 2023". Later, a press release would comment on the video, writing “The clip channels the aesthetic and spirit of the 1997 Quentin Tarantino classic flick of the same name, as it opens with Brent on a plane.” While Uproxx's Megan Armstrong would say it "shows off Faiyaz’s never-ending imagination, which is fitting".

== Charts ==
=== Weekly charts ===
Weekly chart performance for "Jackie Brown"
Chart (2022)	Peak position
South Africa Streaming (TOSAC)	60
UK Singles (OCC)	96
US Hot R&B/Hip-Hop Songs (Billboard)	34
US Bubbling Under Hot 100 (Billboard)	8

== Certifications and sales ==
Certifications for "Jackie Brown"
Region	Certification	Certified units/sales
New Zealand (RMNZ)	Platinum	30,000^{‡}
United Kingdom (BPI)	Silver	200,000^{‡}
United States (RIAA)	Platinum	1,000,000^{‡}
^{‡} Sales+streaming figures based on certification alone.
