= Trust (Brent Faiyaz song) =

Song by Brent Faiyaz

from the EP Lost
- Released: October 19, 2018
- Genre: R&B
- Length: 2:38
- Label: Lost Kids
- Producers: Los Hendrix; Thaddeus Dixon; Nascent; MikeBlud

Music video
- "Trust" on YouTube

"Trust" is a song by American singer and rapper Brent Faiyaz, released through Lost Kids as the third track off his third extended play (EP) Lost, on October 19, 2018. "Trust" had peaked at number thirteen on the US Billboard Bubbling Under Hot 100 chart. It received a 3× Platinum certification from the Recording Industry Association of America (RIAA) and a Platinum certification from the British Phonographic Industry (BPI).

== Background ==
In an interview with Billboard's Carl Lamarre, Faiyaz would describe "Trust" as his "vent" on his life, further explaining that "In 2018, nothing is sacred. Everyone is everywhere and knows everybody. I don’t text too personal because somebody might screenshot it and share it. People stare at me. They stop me and talk my ear off about working and collaborating when I’m drunk in the club or out getting groceries. I’ve had random women find my address and wait outside my apartment building. [There's] no more privacy. Strangers having opinions about me is one of the wildest things I’ve had to come to terms with. Now I just really don’t give a fuck."

== Critical reception ==
Milca P. writing for HotNewHipHop felt the track was "at the midpoint of the effort as Brent croons about the eternal fly-on-the-wall that accompanies fame."

== Charts ==
Weekly chart performance for "Trust"
Chart (2018)	Peak position
US Bubbling Under Hot 100 (Billboard)	13
UK Singles (Official Charts)	98

== Certifications and sales ==
Certifications and sales for Lost
Region	Certification	Certified units/sales
New Zealand (RMNZ)	Platinum	30,000^{‡}
United Kingdom (BPI)	Platinum	600,000^{‡}
United States (RIAA)	3× Platinum	3,000,000^{‡}
^{‡} Sales+streaming figures based on certification alone.
