= Lost (Brent Faiyaz EP) =

EP by Brent Faiyaz
- Released: October 19, 2018
- Recorded: 2018
- Genre: R&B
- Length: 18:44
- Label: Lost Kids
- Producer: Brent Faiyaz; Clinton “HeadAche” Walker; Dpat; James Harte; L.3.G.I.O.N.; Lil Rece; Los Hendrix; MikeBlud; Nascent; Pablo Dylan; Thaddeus Dixon

Brent Faiyaz chronology
Sonder Son (2017)	Lost (2018)	Fuck the World (2020)

Lost is the third extended play (EP) by the American R&B singer Brent Faiyaz, released on October 19, 2018, through Lost Kids, LLC. After rising to prominence with his debut studio album Sonder Son (2017), Faiyaz began working on new material in 2018. He had collaborated with multiple producers such as Pablo Dylan, Los Hendrix, and Nascent, and worked on material in New York, Los Angeles and London.

Lost is an R&B EP that explores themes of anxiety and creative expectations during conflict. The EP was promoted as a follow up to Sonder Son. Music critics praised Lost for its take on the R&B genre. It would later receive a gold certification from Recorded Music NZ.

== Background and recording ==
Faiyaz released his debut studio album, Sonder Son in 2017. Later in 2018, he began working on a new project. Which was later revealed to be "Lost". Lost centers around themes of loyalty, self-reliance, trust issues, a harsh reality, and his struggles as a black man. Faiyaz described the EP as "sacrificing the person you are for who you can become and the struggle to find purity when the whole world tells you aren’t worth anything.”

== Composition ==
Music journalists have described Lost as an R&B and pop release. Lost's opening track begins with crisscrossing harmonies and a beat that seems to droop beneath its own sadness and lyrics exploring the struggles of young black men. On the album's first track “Why’z it So Hard", Faiyaz explains "I am growing increasingly dissatisfied with how the world feels about me. They don’t want us to believe in what we can truly mean to this society. They want us either drugged-out, assed-out, or brains blown-out. They obsess over our struggle and then profit from our lack of resources. We are more complex than how we are portrayed.”

== Critical reception ==
Professional ratings
Review scores
Source	Rating
Pitchfork	6.6/10

Margaret Farrell writing for Pitchfork had felt that the EP was "vulnerable and succinct" also writing that it "embodies the isolation and anxiety of these tunes, with hookups and friends alike passing in and out of Faiyaz’s life." While Nylon's Mariana Carvalho felt it was "the product of an artist who understands that life is more nuanced than a come-up from hardship to the Grammys." Also writing that it is "eminently raw, revealing, and reflective, informed by quixotic melodies and anchored by melancholic refrains. Faiyaz is eager to examine how his interactions with the world impact his mental health and how that, in turn, impacts how he interacts with his music." HotNewHipHop's Alex Zidel felt the mixing of the album was "well-done with vocals being panned at exactly the right spots."

== Track listing ==
Lost track listing
No.	Title	Writer(s)	Producer(s)	Length
1.	"Why'z it so hard"	Christopher Brent Wood; Clinton Walker; Christopher Ruelas	Brent Faiyaz; Headache; Nascent	2:41
2.	"Came Right Back"	Wood; Carlos Daniel Muñoz; David Patino; Jason Elmer Avalos	Imkfed; Faiyaz; Los Hendrix; L.3.G.I.O.N; Dpat	4:00
3.	"Trust"	Wood; Muñoz; Ruelas; Thaddeus Dixon; Michael Bludson	MikeBlud; Nascent; Thaddeus Nixon; Los Hendrix	2:38
4.	"Around Me"	Wood; Sharif Jenkins	Faiyaz; Lil Rece	3:03
5.	"Poundz"	Wood; Avalos; James Harte; Pablo Dylan	James Harte; Pablo Dylan; L.3.G.I.O.N; Faiyaz	3:12
6.	"Target On My Chest"	Wood; Muñoz	Los Hendrix	3:08
Total length:				18:44

=== Notes ===
- Tracks 1 and 5 replace the letter "S" with "Z" on Why's and Pounds, respectively.

=== Additional credits ===
- Darren Boling - recording engineer
- Jeff Jackson - mixing engineer

== Certifications and sales ==
Certifications and sales for Lost
Region	Certification	Certified units/sales
New Zealand (RMNZ)	Gold	7,500^{‡}
^{‡} Sales+streaming figures based on certification alone.
