= Rolling Stone (Brent Faiyaz song) =

Song by Brent Faiyaz

from the album Wasteland
- Released: July 8, 2022
- Genre: R&B
- Length: 2:42
- Label: Lost Kids; Venice; Stem
- Songwriters: Christopher Wood; Christopher Ruelas; Jacob Dutton; Cooper McGill
- Producers: Nascent; Coop the Truth; Jake One

Music video
- "Rolling Stone" on YouTube

"Rolling Stone" (stylized in all caps) is a song by American R&B singer Brent Faiyaz and the tenth track from his second studio album, Wasteland (2022). It was produced by Nascent, Jake One, and Coop the Truth. The song would debut at number 84 on the Billboard Hot 100 chart and receive a gold certification from the Recording Industry Association of America (RIAA).

== Background and composition ==
"Rolling Stone" is an R&B song produced by Nascent, Jake One, and Coop the Truth. In 2023, Faiyaz announced his Fuck The World, It's a Wasteland tour, later releasing the music video for "Rolling Stone". The music video, directed by LoneWolf and Mark Peaced. Depicts a black-and-white environment with Faiyaz watches television in his residence, and getting into an argument with an apparent love interest and taking flicks with fans. The song's lyrics center around the highs and lows of Faiyaz's lifestyle.

== Critical reception ==
Jon Caramanica writing for The New York Times felt the song was "spacious and ethereal but not directionless—it is R&B that privileges mood over structure, soft daubs of feeling over authoritative belting." While Clash's Robin Murray wrote the song "find[s] Brent daring to pull down the curtain of hype that surrounds him, and let fans see a little extra from his world." Jem Aswad of Variety said the song was "infectious".

== Charts ==
Weekly chart performance for "Rolling Stone"
Chart (2022)	Peak position
US Billboard Hot 100	84

== Certifications and sales ==
Certifications for "Rolling Stone"
Region	Certification	Certified units/sales
New Zealand (RMNZ)	Gold	15,000^{‡}
United States (RIAA)	Platinum	1,000,000^{‡}
^{‡} Sales+streaming figures based on certification alone.
