= Sonder Son =

Studio album by Brent Faiyaz
- Released: October 13, 2017
- Genres: Alternative R&B; pop
- Length: 42:25
- Labels: Lost Kids; Venice; Stem
- Producers: Brent Faiyaz; Atu; Ben Free; D-Pat; James Harte; Joey Lopez; Los Hendrix; Nascent; Pablo Dylan; Paperboy Fabe; Yves “Bus” Bazelais Jr.

Brent Faiyaz chronology
Into (with Sonder) (2017)	Sonder Son (2017)	Lost (2018)

Sonder Son is the debut studio album by American R&B singer Brent Faiyaz. It was released on October 13, 2017, through Lost Kids, Venice Music, and Stem Disintermedia. With no guest appearances, the album's production was primarily handled by Faiyaz, D-Pat, and Atu, the three members of Sonder, with assistance from Ben Free, Joey Lopez, Los Hendrix, Paperboy Fabe, and several other producers. The album serves as a follow-up to Faiyaz's solo EP, A.M. Paradox (2016), and Sonder's EP, Into (2017).

== Background and recording ==
Upon the release of the album, Faiyaz appeared in an interview with Clash in which the album was described as Faiyaz's "autobiography". He revealed that initially, Sonder Son would be a concept album based on his experience of moving to Los Angeles, California, from his hometown of Columbia, Maryland, however, he scrapped because he'd "be skipping out a lot of shit". When asked about the album's recording process, he noted that he "didn't really do it chronologically" and that he "really just wanted to make it mad personal" and for "[the album" to be cathartic for me more than anything". He stated that he "made some shit that [he] knew was good music but for [him] personally, it wasn’t as personal as this project". When asked about his writing process, Faiyaz explained that he "write[s] a lot anyway, whether it be poems or short notes or little things throughout the week or the day or whatever". He continued, "a lot of shit based off conversation. Those can turn into songs or they can just say how they are. But [he can] pretty much write anywhere. And then sometimes [he] can go into the studio and not write at all". During the interview, Faiyaz revealed that during the recording process, he listened to Jeff Buckley, Radiohead, Aaliyah, and Lauryn Hill's critically acclaimed, The Miseducation of Lauryn Hill. He also stated that he'd often listen to Tupac Shakur's Me Against the World. In Faiyaz's interview with Complex, he stated that the album's title is an extension of Sonder because he's the group's lead vocalist, therefore, he "figured it made sense to call the project Sonder Son because that’s where it all came from". He also stated that the project is "a lot more personal and introspective" than his previous work. Faiyaz revealed that he spent a month in the Dominican Republic to record the album because of his Dominican ancestry. He stated he wanted to leave the country to record his debut album because "being out there brought some different energy out of [him] that [he] couldn’t get in L.A.", and that "interacting with people who didn’t have nothing made me see that the shit I thought was important was insignificant". In February 2018, Faiyaz appeared in an interview with Billboard, Faiyaz said that while on the plane ride to the Dominican Republic, the only album he listened to was The Miseducation of Lauryn Hill and that it inspired him to make the album unique, noting that he wanted to "do something different".

In April, Faiyaz appeared in an interview with the Los Angeles Times' Sonaiya Kelley, Faiyaz spoke about the foundation of Sonder, noting that "the main reason we started Sonder and released it under that name was because if we were to say 'Dpat and Atu with Brent' it just wouldn’t sound as good". Faiyaz revealed that going to the Dominican Republic "affected the whole concept of the album" due to the "rampant" poverty acting as a culture shock to him. He stated that there were "a lot of ideas that [he] had prior to the trip that [he] scrapped once [he] got there. The [stuff he] thought was important to [him] really wasn’t important no more". When asked about the writing process, Faiyaz said:

It’s one of those albums that take a whole lifetime to write. I mean, we did it fast, but I think it’s because a lot of inspiration for the album was from a long time ago. So it was easy to put together a project so quickly when it’s a record about your whole introduction.

== Release and promotion ==
While on the twelve-stop US Into Tour with Sonder, on September 19, Faiyaz revealed the album's official artwork, tracklist, and release date through his Instagram. Upon the release of the album, Faiyaz announced the pre-sale of his solo North America, seventeen-stop Sonder Son Tour, beginning on January 30, 2018, in Chicago, Illinois, and concluding on March 2, in Seattle, Washington. The tour was supported by Diana Gordon and Amber Olivier. Following the completion of the tour, Faiyaz added an additional three dates in London, England, on March 14, Paris, France, on March 16, and Berlin, Germany, on March 18. On July 18, Faiyaz released the Noah Lee-directed official music video for "Gang Over Luv" which "tells the story of a camera lens surveying questions of solitude".

== Critical reception ==
Sonder Son ratings
Review scores
Source	Rating
Exclaim!	7/10
Pitchfork	6.1/10

Exclaim!'s Yasin Rahman wrote that on Sonder Son, "he slows it down and reflects on his past" and "takes listeners on a journey through his recently found fame." He stated that "simple instrumentals and a melodic voice play secondary components to the story here," and that " Faiyaz reflects on his past dealings with family, friends, and lovers." He noted that Faiyaz's "songwriting vividly depicts his life," however, there is a "lack of instrumental variety throughout the project." Concluding his review, he wrote that Faiyaz "reflects on his past as he pushes forward in his career" and that "it would be interesting to see Faiyaz sing across a broader range of sounds." Writing for Pitchfork, Claire Lobenfeld stated that Sonder Son is a "forthright about the fact that we need each other to survive." Lobenfeld compared the project to Frank Ocean's February 2011, Nostalgia, Ultra, stating that it "has the same highly intimate, nothing-to-lose quality" of the project. Continuing her review, she stated that "the album is well-studied in the tones and textures of the past" and "the songs here may not be so sticky, but the promise of his potential is undeniable."

=== Year-end lists ===
Select year-end rankings of Sonder Son
Publication	List	Rank	Ref.
Okayplayer	The Best Albums Of 2017	12	

== Track listing ==
Sonder Son track listing
No.	Title	Writer(s)	Producer(s)	Length
1.	"Home"	Christopher Wood; Ben Free; David Patino	Brent Faiyaz; Ben Free; D-Pat	1:51
2.	"Gang Over Luv"	Wood; Christopher Ruelas	Brent Faiyaz; Nascent	3:25
3.	"Burn One (Interlude)"	Wood; Carlos Muñoz	Los Hendrix	1:49
4.	"First World Problemz/Nobody Carez"	Wood; Patino; Muñoz; Ruelas	Brent Faiyaz; D-Pat; Los Hendrix; Nascent	5:51
5.	"Missing Out"	Wood; Free; Patino; Muñoz	Brent Faiyaz; Ben Free; D-Pat; Los Hendrix	3:53
6.	"Stay Down"	Wood; Free; Patino; Muñoz; Ruelas; Fabbien Nahounou	Brent Faiyaz; Ben Free; D-Pat; Los Hendrix; Nascent; Paperboy Fabe	3:27
7.	"L.A."	Wood; Joey Lopez; Nahounou; Yves Bazelais Jr.	Joey Lopez; Paperboy Fabe; Yves “Bus” Bazelais Jr.	5:16
8.	"Talk 2 U"	Wood; Muñoz	Los Hendrix	2:39
9.	"Sonder Son (Interlude)"	Wood; Atupele Ndisale; Patino; Muñoz	Atu; D-Pat; Los Hendrix	1:40
10.	"So Far Gone/Fast Life Bluez"	Wood; Ndisale; Patino	Atu; D-Pat	5:31
11.	"Needed"	Wood; James Harte; Pablo Dylan	James Harte; Pablo Dylan	4:08
12.	"All I Want"	Wood; Lopez; Nahounou	Brent Faiyaz; Joey Lopez; Paperboy Fabe	2:55
Total length:				42:25

== Certifications ==
Certifications for Sonder Son
Region	Certification	Certified units/sales
United States (RIAA)	Gold	500,000^{‡}
^{‡} Sales+streaming figures based on certification alone.

== Release history ==
Release dates and formats for Sonder Son
Region	Date	Label(s)	Format(s)	Edition(s)	Ref.
Various	October 13, 2017	Lost Kids; Venice; Stem	Digital download; streaming	Standard	
United States	October 13, 2017	Lost Kids; Venice; Stem	LP	Standard	
United States	June 17, 2023	Lost Kids; Venice; Stem	LP	Standard	
