= Wasting Time (Brent Faiyaz song) =

2021 single by Brent Faiyaz featuring Drake

Single by Brent Faiyaz featuring Drake

from the album Wasteland
- Released: July 1, 2021
- Genre: R&B
- Length: 5:01
- Label: Lost Kids; Venice; Stem
- Songwriters: Christopher Wood; Aubrey Graham; Pharrell Williams; Charles Hugo
- Producer: The Neptunes

Brent Faiyaz singles chronology
"Show U Off" (2021)	"Wasting Time" (2021)	"Price of Fame" (2022)

Drake singles chronology
"Having Our Way" (2021)	"Wasting Time" (2021)	"Over the Top" (2021)

"Wasting Time" is a song by American R&B singer Brent Faiyaz featuring Canadian rapper Drake. The song was produced by The Neptunes. It was released on July 1, 2021.

== Background ==
On June 30, 2021, the song leaked and it was made available on Apple Music in New Zealand. It was released the next day. The cover art of the single pays tribute to Pharrell Williams' album In My Mind.

== Composition ==
The song features "lush synth pads and booming 808s", and finds the artists asking their respective lovers for more quality time with them. In the chorus, Faiyaz sings, "If you're gonna waste your time / Then waste your time with me / You can have all the space / More than you need / It's no pressure, girl / If you got time to waste / Waste it with me". Drake's verse is about his frustrations and distrust towards past lovers; he raps about how they "stay calculatin' moves, like Beth Harmon" and calls himself a "pessimist gold medalist". He also swears to be more "'Purple Rain' Prince than Prince Charmin'" and name-drops Aaliyah ("Only time I play the back and forth is Aaliyah record").

== Critical reception ==
Jordan Darville of The Fader wrote that the song "aims for a woozy and timeless atmosphere, boosted by soaring orchestral strings and a crackling chemistry between Faiyaz's vocals and Drake's bars." Jordan Rose of Complex noted the song sharing a common theme with Brent Faiyaz's song "Gravity", in that he "croons about respecting his lover's space, but still being willing to share his world with her".

== Charts ==
Chart performance for "Wasting Time"
Chart (2021)	Peak position
Canada Hot 100 (Billboard)	44
Ireland (IRMA)	82
New Zealand Hot Singles (RMNZ)	5
South Africa Streaming (TOSAC)	42
UK Singles (OCC)	34
US Billboard Hot 100	49
US Hot R&B/Hip-Hop Songs (Billboard)	17
US Rhythmic Airplay (Billboard)	27
US Rolling Stone Top 100	25

== Certifications ==
Region	Certification	Certified units/sales
United States (RIAA)	Platinum	1,000,000^{‡}
^{‡} Sales+streaming figures based on certification alone.
