= Ama (musician) =

English singer-songwriter

- Born: Ama Louisa John; 9 May 1998 (age 28); London, England
- Genres: R&B
- Occupations: Singer; songwriter
- Years active: 2016–present
- Label: Interscope
- Website: amaofficial.co

Ama Louisa John (born 9 May 1998), known professionally as Ama Lou or simply Ama, is an English singer and songwriter born and raised in London. She is classically trained as a singer and began writing music at the age of 11.

== Early life ==
Ama was born in north London, England to a Guyanese father and English mother. She grew up writing music, taking guitar lessons as young as seven or eight. She would lie about her age in order to play open mic nights in London when she was 13 years of age. Ama grew up listening to Gil Scott-Heron, Billie Holiday and Ella Fitzgerald.

== Career ==
Ama released her debut single "TBC" in 2016. During her support of Jorja Smith during her 2018 tour, she received media attention after Drake captioned an Instagram post with lyrics from her song "TBC". Drake also stated that Lou was one of the main influences for his album Scorpion.

Ama signed to Interscope Records in late 2019. She released her debut album I Came Home Late in 2023. She signed to ISO Supremacy, a record label run by Brent Faiyaz, in 2025. In 2025, Ama released "My Girl", a single from her self-titled album. The album released on 19 June 2026.

She opened for Ella Mai's 2026 North American Do You Still Love Me? Tour.

== Discography ==
=== Studio albums ===
List of albums with selected details
Title	Album details
I Came Home Late	Released: 1 September 2023; Label: Interscope Records; Format: Digital download, streaming
Ama	Released: 19 June 2026; Label: I Came Home Late, ISO Supremacy; Format: Digital download, streaming

=== Extended plays ===
List of extended plays with selected details
Title	Extended play details
DDD	Released: 28 March 2018; Label: Self-released; Format: Digital download, streaming
Ama, who?	Released: 15 November 2019; Label: Interscope Records; Format: Digital download, streaming
At Least We Have This	Released: 26 November 2021; Label: Interscope Records; Format: Digital download, streaming
