= All Mine (Brent Faiyaz song) =

2022 song by Brent Faiyaz

Song by Brent Faiyaz

from the album Wasteland
- Released: July 8, 2022
- Length: 3:37
- Label: Lost Kids; Venice; Stem
- Songwriter: Christopher Wood
- Producer: Brent Faiyaz

Music video
- "All Mine" on YouTube

"All Mine" (stylized in all caps) is a song by American R&B singer Brent Faiyaz and the sixth track from his sophomore studio album, Wasteland (2022). It was produced by Brent Faiyaz himself.

== Composition ==
Clash's Robin Murray wrote that the song is "pensive and affecting." Writing for HipHopDX, David Aaron Brake wrote that the song is "euphoric" and that the track is "self-produced" and has an "army of synths in various stages of crescendo." He also stated that "the notes [wash] against his voice like waves."

== Critical reception ==
HipHopDX's David Aaron Brake stated that Brent is "marrying his corrosive dedication of love" to the song's beat. The New York Times' Jon Caramanica stated that the song "sounds like it’s being delivered through a shower of static" while he's "aggressive flirting" on the track. Pitchfork's Dani Blum referred to the song as "[one of] the most effective songs" on the album, noting that it "unspools gauzy strands of harmonies."

== Music video ==
The Lone Wolf and Mark Peaced-directed music video was released months after the song's release on September 28, 2022. The video has a "black-and-white visual" and "translates the song’s anxiety into a high-class conflict." The video stars the Puerto Rican supermodel and TV personality Joan Smalls as Brent's "Leading lady."

== Charts ==
=== Weekly charts ===
Weekly chart performance for "All Mine"
Chart (2022)	Peak position
Canada Hot 100 (Billboard)	85
Global 200 (Billboard)	67
New Zealand Hot Singles (RMNZ)	4
South Africa Streaming (TOSAC)	14
UK Singles (Official Charts)	96
US Billboard Hot 100	42
US Hot R&B/Hip-Hop Songs (Billboard)	10

=== Year-end charts ===
year-end chart performance for "All Mine"
Chart (2022)	Position
US Hot R&B/Hip-Hop Songs (Billboard)	60

== Certifications ==
Region	Certification	Certified units/sales
New Zealand (RMNZ)	Platinum	30,000^{‡}
United Kingdom (BPI)	Gold	400,000^{‡}
United States (RIAA)	3× Platinum	3,000,000^{‡}
^{‡} Sales+streaming figures based on certification alone.
