= Price of Fame (Brent Faiyaz song) =

2022 single by Brent Faiyaz

Single by Brent Faiyaz

from the EP Do Not Listen and the album Wasteland
- Released: June 24, 2022
- Genre: R&B; trap
- Length: 6:19
- Label: Lost Kids
- Songwriters: Christopher Wood; Sharif Jenkins; Christopher Ruelas; Jason Avalos; Sam Wishkoski
- Producers: Brent Faiyaz; Lil Rece; Nascent; L3gion; Sam Wish

Brent Faiyaz singles chronology
"Mercedes" (2021)	"Price of Fame" (2022)	"Trillions" (2022)

Music video
- "Price of Fame" on YouTube

"Price of Fame" is a song by American R&B singer Brent Faiyaz, first released in February 2021 from his online EP Do Not Listen. It was officially released in June 2022 as the fourth single from his second studio album Wasteland (2022). The song was produced by Faiyaz himself, Lil Rece, Nascent, L3gion and Sam Wish.

== Background and release ==
On February 8, 2021, Brent Faiyaz shared a Dropbox link to Do Not Listen, a record of three new songs including "Price of Fame". He released the song to streaming services on June 24, 2022. The official version is six minutes long and musically different from the original, in that the song begins as chopped and screwed and speeds up before slowing down once more, after which it transitions to "lullaby-esque vibes rather than grunge" as in the earlier version.

== Composition ==
Its lyrics center around the struggles of being a celebrity, as Faiyaz explores how it affects his relationships with women and desire for peace. The song contains two parts. In the first, Faiyaz details how some people want him to fail and the difficulty of pretending to be happy. He sings in the chorus, "(The fame) I swear it isn't everything / (Glitz and glam) It isn't everything / (People screaming your name) I swear it isn't everything / (The demands) It isn't everything". The second half of the song centers on his interest in starting a relationship with a particular person. He acknowledges he is not perfect but believes he has found the ideal partner.

== Charts ==
Chart performance for "Price of Fame"
Chart (2022)	Peak position
Global 200 (Billboard)	143
New Zealand Hot Singles (RMNZ)	22
South Africa Streaming (TOSAC)	29
US Billboard Hot 100	67
US Hot R&B/Hip-Hop Songs (Billboard)	18

== Certifications ==
Region	Certification	Certified units/sales
United States (RIAA)	Gold	500,000^{‡}
^{‡} Sales+streaming figures based on certification alone.
