= Paperboy Fabe =

American musician (born 1984)

- Born: Fabbien Nahounou; May 19, 1984 (age 41); Oklahoma City, Oklahoma, U.S.
- Genres: R&B, pop, alternative, hip hop
- Occupation: Record producer
- Years active: 2009–present
- Website: paperboyfabe.com

Fabbien Nahounou (born May 19, 1984), better known as Paperboy Fabe, is an American R&B, hip hop, and contemporary music producer. He is best known for his production on Cyhi Da Prynce "Studda", The Game's "Do It B.I.G" featuring Yung Joc, and Cyhi Da Prynce's "Thousand Poundz" featuring Pusha T & Pill, and for developing Bibi Bourelly's sound.

== Music career ==
Paperboy Fabe moved to Atlanta, Georgia from Connecticut in 2002 to attend Clark Atlanta University. There he entered into his first beat battle, and won first place over producer, M16, gaining notoriety on the Atlanta scene.

Paperboy Fabe continued winning beat battles in Atlanta, New Jersey, and California. He was introduced to Cyhi Da Prynce, which led to a placement on Cyhi Da Prynce's mixtape Royal Flush Vol. 1, hosted by Greg Street. Cyhi Da Prynce went on to make a video for the song "Studda", which Paperboy Fabe produced. The video went viral and was posted on Kanye West's blog. Soon after, Cyhi Da Prynce was signed to G.O.O.D Music, with a large contribution of Paperboy Fabe's work.

Rapper Game heard one of Paperboy Fabe's tracks via a mutual friend while in Atlanta. Game loved the beat and instantly released a song the very next day entitled "We Do It Big", featuring Yung Joc. The song became the official promotional single for Game's next studio album, The R.E.D Album. The track failed to make the album due to clearance issues; however, it made the mixtape Break Lights, hosted by DJ Skee.

Soon afterwards, Paperboy Fabe had the honor of working with Cyhi Da Prynce again when he produced "Thousand Poundz", featuring Pusha T and Pill. The track appeared on the mixtape Royal Flush Vol. 2.

Paperboy Fabe got his first major placement on Ledisi's album Pieces of Me. She used the same instrumental that Cyhi Da Prynce used on his mixtape Royal Flush Vol. 1, for the song "Studda". The track on the album is titled "Coffee". The placement brought Paperboy Fabe his first Grammy nomination.

Paperboy Fabe relocated again to Los Angeles, where he currently resides, to further himself in the music industry has an A&R and producer.

In 2013, Paperboy Fabe began developing Bibi Bourelly's sound as a writer and artist, which quickly led to her working with Kanye West and Rihanna. In 2015 he executive produced her debut album.

In 2016, Paperboy Fabe took a break from music and began focusing on finding new talent. Before long, his partner/friend Worldwide Ty introduced him to Brent Faiyaz. From there, Fabe quickly started focusing on Brent and eventually put his music team together executive producing Brent's first EP, A.M Paradox, and also co-executive producing Brent's debut album Sonder Son.

In 2018, Paperboy Fabe began to travel back and forth to his homeland in West Africa by way of Côte d'Ivoire to begin working on the infusion of Afrobeat and R&B. He is currently working with many local artists from the Ivory Coast, Ghana, Ethiopia & Nigeria.

== Discography ==
=== 2009 ===
==== Cyhi Da Prynce - Royal Flush I ====
- 13. "Studda"

=== 2010 ===
==== Game - Brake Lights ====
- 12. "Do it B.I.G" featuring Yung Joc

==== Jay Rock - Black Friday ====
- 08. "In These Streets" (featuring Spider Loc)

=== 2011 ===
==== Ledisi - Pieces of Me ====
- 05. "Coffee"

==== Cyhi Da Prynce - Royal Flush II ====
- 05. "Thousand Poundz" (featuring Pusha T & Pill)

=== 2013 ===
==== TGT - Three Kings ====
- 01. "Take it Wrong" (performed by Ginuwine, Tank & Black-Ty)

=== 2016 ===
==== Bibi Bourelly ====
- "Sally"
- "Ego"
- "Riot"
- "Guitar"
- "Poet"
- "Flowers"
- "Fool"

=== Brent Faiyaz - A.M. Paradox ===
- 03. "Invite Me" (Drum Programming)
- 05. "No One Knows"

=== Brent Faiyaz - Sonder Son ===
- 06. "Stay Down"
- 07. "LA"
- 12. "All I Want"

==== Brent Faiyaz ====
- "Language"

=== 2018 ===
==== Wale - Free Lunch ====
- 01. "Dummies

=== 2019 ===
==== Juice WRLD - Death Race For Love ====
- 04. "Demonz

=== 2022 ===
==== Brent Faiyaz - Wasteland ====
- 02. "Loose Change"
- 15. "Role Model"
- 17. "Bad Luck"

== Awards and nominations ==
=== Grammy Awards ===
The Grammy Awards are awarded annually by the National Academy of Recording Arts and Sciences. Paperboy Fabe has been nominated two times.

Year	Nominated work	Award	Result
2012	Pieces of Me	R&B Album of the Year	Nominated

Year	Nominated work	Award	Result
2014	Three Kings (album) TGT (group)	Best R&B Album	Nominated
