= Wasteland (Brent Faiyaz album) =

2022 studio album

Studio album by Brent Faiyaz
- Released: July 8, 2022
- Recorded: 2020
- Genre: R&B
- Length: 64:08
- Labels: Lost Kids; Venice; Stem
- Producers: Beat Butcha; Brent Faiyaz; Che Pope; Coop the Truth; DJ Dahi; Dpat; Freeze; Jake One; Jordan Ware; L3gion; Lil Rece; Los Hendrix; Mike Blud; Nascent; No I.D.; Paperboy Fabe; Prep Bijan; Raphael Saadiq; Sam Wish; The Neptunes

Brent Faiyaz chronology
Fuck the World (2020)	Wasteland (2022)	Too Late to Die Young (with Sonder) (2022)

Singles from Wasteland
- 1. "Dead Man Walking" Released: September 20, 2020; 2. "Gravity" Released: January 29, 2021; 3. "Wasting Time" Released: July 1, 2021; 4. "Price of Fame" Released: June 24, 2022

Wasteland (stylized in all caps) is the sophomore studio album by American R&B singer Brent Faiyaz, released on July 8, 2022, through Lost Kids, Venice Music, and Stem Disintermedia. The album features guest appearances from Alicia Keys, DJ Dahi, Drake, Joony, Tre Amani, and Tyler, the Creator, while the album's production was primarily handled by Faiyaz himself and Jordan Ware, with assistance from Beat Butcha, Che Pope, DJ Dahi, Jake One, No I.D., Paperboy Fabe, Raphael Saadiq, The Neptunes, and the album's executive producer, Jonathan "Freeze" Wells. The album serves as a follow-up to the EP Fuck the World (2020).

Wasteland received "generally favorable" reviews from music critics who praised the album's "smooth" production and Faiyaz's vocals. It debuted at number two on the US Billboard 200 chart, in which it earned 88,000 album-equivalent units, of which 6,000 were pure album sales while nine out of the seventeen album tracks debuted on the US Billboard Hot 100 chart. The album was supported by four official singles: "Dead Man Walking", "Gravity" with DJ Dahi featuring Tyler, the Creator, "Wasting Time" featuring Drake, and "Price of Fame".

== Background and recording ==
Upon the album's release, Faiyaz appeared in an interview with Rolling Stone, during which he was asked about the album's recording process and its composition. Faiyaz revealed that originally, the album was supposed to only be thirteen tracks, instead of the final nineteen. He noted that "it was just little things that were missing about [the album]. It was a narrative I felt like wasn't all the way told, it was some sonic moments that I didn't get a chance to create yet. So I went back in the last two to three months and cut more new ideas. That's when I felt like it was done". When asked where the album was recorded, Faiyaz went in-depth:

Everywhere. Even with this album, I did this in every city. I did some of it in New York, some of it in Atlanta. Some of it in Los Angeles, some of it in the Bahamas. Everywhere. I just like cooking up wherever I'm at, and I catch a vibe just naturally. If I am out and I'm faded and I feel a type of way that makes me want to write something, I'll just be like, "Somebody book me some studio time," wherever. Fly the engineer out so I can cook some shit up right here, right now.

For Vogue, Faiyaz called the making of the album "less of an album process and more of a life process" where he "made a collection of songs and tied a story line together once I saw that they all kind of shared a similar theme" and "didn't really realize I was working on an album until I was maybe a little over halfway through". Asked to name his inspirations for the album, he said "I was watching a lot of Tarantino films. I was watching Jackie Brown over and over again. I was also watching Vanilla Sky on repeat. I pulled a lot from that. But mostly I was inspired by the different people that I locked in with, from The Dream [sic] to Alicia Keys. I was just soaking up game from artists like Raphael Saadiq and No I.D., who have been doing this longer than I have". For Business Insider, Faiyaz broke down the significance and background behind the skits on the album. Faiyaz revealed that the album's lead single, "Dead Man Walking" was inspired by the murder of George Floyd, noting that he "built the record around [the song]" and that he "spent maybe that whole two years making that project" from 2020 to 2022. Faiyaz stated that he "couldn't skip the steps and not tell the whole story" and that the skits were later added to the album by its executive producer, Jonathan "Freeze" Wells:

With the skits and the women characters involved, In "Wake Up Call," she doesn't want to have my kid but is pregnant. Her not wanting to have the baby and feeling like she is forced to commit suicide touches on the current times we are in. Women's rights are being stripped as we speak, Wasteland is going to touch on a lot of different topics. While there are a lot of moments of clarity as well, there are many sobering moments. At the same time, you may have nights where you turn everything up too much and wake up the next morning by yourself and your heart hurts. Wasteland is about it all.

With the majority of the album being recorded during and post the COVID-19 pandemic, Faiyaz revealed that "Wasteland is very much this post-pandemic space of confusion and loss, and I guess reckless abandonment" while noting that because "everybody was in the space where we lost somebody during COVID", the album's title refers to what he thought America was and "what this world we're living in was", at the time. However, due to Faiyaz's rising to prominence during the pandemic, he believed that the term "wasteland" would serve as a reflection on his "view or [his] idea of what [he] thought fame was going to look like, or what it was going be". In an interview with Grammy, Faiyaz spoke about how his feelings alternate between the release of Wasteland and the release of Fuck the World (2020):

I was sitting with Wasteland for a while because it is a compilation of a bunch of songs that I have strung together through a story. I wanted to create a body of work that I would enjoy listening to. Wasteland is my favorite project so far and I really created this one for the homies, so we could all listen and play it together.

== Release and promotion ==
On September 18, 2020, Faiyaz released the album's lead single, "Dead Man Walking". On January 29, 2021, Faiyaz returned with the album's second single "Gravity" with DJ Dahi featuring Tyler, the Creator, who provides a "spacey" verse, while Faiyaz sings of "uncertain love and raps in a distilled voice praising loyalty from his female companion". On February 8, Faiyaz released the non-album single, "Circles". On July 1, Faiyaz released the Drake and The Neptunes-assisted single, "Wasting Time". On December 3, Faiyaz released the non-album single "Mercedes", after having teased Wasteland on his Instagram. On June 17, 2022, Faiyaz officially announced the release of Wasteland for July 8. The following week, on June 24, Faiyaz officially released the album's final single, "Price of Fame". Alongside the release of the single, Faiyaz shared the album's artwork and tracklist. Upon the album's release, on July 29, Faiyaz released the official music video for "Villain's Theme", directed by Lone Wolf and Mark Peaced. On September 9, Faiyaz released the official music video for "Loose Change", featuring Faiyaz watching a ballet adaptation of the album. The video, shot in black-and-white, also features American Olympic gymnast Nastasya Generalova as another audience member and was directed by Lone Wolf and Mark Peaced. On September 28, Faiyaz released the music video for "All Mine". On November 21, Faiyaz performed "All Mine" on The Tonight Show Starring Jimmy Fallon. On May 2, 2023, Faiyaz released the official music video for "Rolling Stone". On May 5, Faiyaz released a chopped and screwed remix album, titled Wasteland – Chopped Not Slopped, produced by DJ Candlestick of the Chopstars. On August 16, Faiyaz released the music video for "Jackie Brown".

== Style ==
Per Stereogum's Tom Breihan, the album's "clear focal point is Faiyaz, who sings so beautifully about ugly situations", with interlude sketches which Breihan compares to Kendrick Lamar's "We Cry Together", saying that they contain "Faiyaz and his baby's mother argu[ing] about their relationship, and things get[ting] intense enough to put all of the album's seduction-talk into a bracing and self-destructive new context." Complex's Joe Price called the album "an expansive effort that sees Faiyaz at his most confident" where "atop nocturnal, sparse production, he flaunts his smooth vocals and penchant for effortless hooks" and even "finds time to experiment, including on "Ghetto Gatsby", which features almost no percussion."

== Critical reception ==
Wasteland ratings
Aggregate scores
Source	Rating
Metacritic	73/100
Review scores
Source	Rating
AllMusic	4/5 stars
Clash	7/10
HipHopDX	4.2/5
The New York Times	6/10
Pitchfork	5.9/10

According to the review aggregator Metacritic, Wasteland received "generally favorable reviews" based on a weighted average score of 73 out of 100 from 5 critic scores.

Clash's Robin Murray wrote that Wasteland "has been some five years in the making, and its arrival feels like a genuine event", noting a "palpable excitement online" with Faiyaz "trending globally for hours", but "the album doesn't quite feel like it meets the hype." Given the length of time leading up to the release, "some of the blockbuster highlights – the epic Tyler[, the Creator] feature, for example – have been online for some time now, dulling the unified impact." The album "contains some imperious highs" such as "Loose Change" which is "truly beautiful, the arrangement somehow both gloriously languid and ultra-minimalist", but the album suffers for a "streaming-friendly 19 tracks" which "could bare a little trimming" as well as "some songs that don't land" like "inessential" "Bad Luck" and "Addictions" which "takes the toxicity banner a little too far." The Guardian's Tara Joshi wrote that "Although Faiyaz already has a dedicated fanbase, this assured, sensual and ambitious record looks likely to bring him to an ever-wider audience."

Dani Blum of Pitchfork felt that Faiyaz's "lovely vocals and intriguing ideas" are lost "underneath blockbuster features and irritating interludes." The album is "cinematic in the most clunkily literal sense", with three skits and a "two-and-half-minute-long ramble" of an introduction which "culminates in an intriguing, if not obvious question: 'What purpose do your vices serve in your life?'", a question to which Faiyaz "spends the next hour dodging the answer." Compared to "clear influence[s]" Drake and The Weeknd, who both "ground [their] aching melodrama in tangible grit, sculpting scenes out of specifics", Faiyaz "mainly opts for sweeping statements about how evil he is, a rigid moral clarity that sometimes comes across as laziness" with any detail only acting to "further fuel the caricature."

=== Year-end lists ===
Wasteland on year-end lists
Publication	#	Ref.
Billboard	45	
Complex	46	
The Fader	6	
Nylon	N/A	
Rolling Stone	32	
Uproxx	N/A	

== Commercial performance ==
Wasteland debuted at number two on the US Billboard 200 chart, earning 88,000 album-equivalent units (including 6,000 copies in pure album sales) in its first week. This became Brent Faiyaz's first US top-ten debut on the chart. The album also accumulated a total of 107.48 million on-demand official streams from the set's tracks. In its second week, the album dropped to number nine on the chart, earning an additional 32,000 units. On September 18, 2023, the album was certified Platinum by the Recording Industry Association of America (RIAA) for combined sales and album-equivalent units of over 1,000,000 units in the United States.

== Track listing ==
All tracks are written by Christopher Wood with others noted.

Wasteland track listing
No.	Title	Writer(s)	Producers	Length
1.	"Villain's Theme"	Jordan Ware; Jonathan Wells; Jorja Smith	Ware; Freeze	2:21
2.	"Loose Change"	Ware; Fabbien Nahounou; Raphael Saadiq; Dion Wilson; Eliot Dubock; Terius Nash	Ware; Paperboy Fabe; Saadiq; No I.D.; Brent Faiyaz; Beat Butcha	3:46
3.	"Gravity" (with DJ Dahi featuring Tyler, the Creator)	Dacoury Natche; Tyler Okonma; Steve Lacy	DJ Dahi	3:35
4.	"Heal Your Heart (Interlude)"	Dubock; Michael Bludson	Beat Butcha; Mike Blud	1:15
5.	"Skit: Egomaniac"	Wells; Bludson; Ware	Freeze; Mike Blud; Ware	1:26
6.	"All Mine"	Wood	Faiyaz	3:36
7.	"Price of Fame"	Sharif Jenkins; Christopher Ruelas; Jason Avalos; Samuel Wishkoski	Faiyaz; Lil Rece; Nascent; L3gion; Sam Wish	6:19
8.	"Ghetto Gatsby" (featuring Alicia Keys)	Alicia Cook; Ware; Saadiq; Nash	Ware; Saadiq	3:18
9.	"Wasting Time" (featuring Drake and The Neptunes)	Aubrey Graham; Pharrell Williams; Chad Hugo	The Neptunes	5:01
10.	"Rolling Stone"	Cooper McGill; Jacob Dutton; Ruelas; Nash	Coop the Truth; Jake One; Nascent	2:42
11.	"FYTB" (featuring Joony)	Jonathan Negero; Che Pope; David Hughes	Pope; Prep Bijan	3:18
12.	"Skit: Oblivion"	Wells	Freeze	2:47
13.	"Dead Man Walking"	David Patino; Ware; Jenkins; Maurice Willis	Faiyaz; Dpat; Ware; Lil Rece	4:07
14.	"Addictions" (featuring Tre' Amani)	Trey Miller; Ware; Dubock	Faiyaz; Ware; Beat Butcha	3:12
15.	"Role Model"	Ware; Wilson; Nahounou; Malcolm Mays	Faiyaz; Ware; No I.D.; Paperboy Fabe	3:14
16.	"Jackie Brown"	Avalos; Ware; Stephen Garrett; Timothy Mosley	Faiyaz; L3gion; Ware	2:49
17.	"Bad Luck"	Nahounou; Carlos Muñoz; Avalos; Ware; Nash	Paperboy Fabe; Loshendrix; L3gion; Faiyaz; Ware	2:42
18.	"Skit: Wake Up Call"	Wells	Freeze	5:05
19.	"Angel"	Ware; Saadiq	Ware; Saadiq	3:39
Total length:				64:08

== Charts ==
=== Weekly charts ===
Weekly chart performance for Wasteland
Chart (2022)	Peak position
Australian Albums (ARIA)	11
Austrian Albums (Ö3 Austria)	45
Belgian Albums (Ultratop Flanders)	35
Belgian Albums (Ultratop Wallonia)	76
Canadian Albums (Billboard)	5
Danish Albums (Hitlisten)	22
Dutch Albums (Album Top 100)	12
Irish Albums (Official Charts)	15
Lithuanian Albums (AGATA)	15
New Zealand Albums (RMNZ)	2
Norwegian Albums (VG-lista)	9
Swiss Albums (Schweizer Hitparade)	17
UK Albums (Official Charts)	6
UK R&B Albums (Official Charts)	17
US Billboard 200	2
US Top R&B/Hip-Hop Albums (Billboard)	1

=== Year-end charts ===
2022 year-end chart performance for Wasteland
Chart (2022)	Position
US Billboard 200	151
US Independent Albums (Billboard)	22
US Top R&B/Hip-Hop Albums (Billboard)	48

2023 year-end chart performance for Wasteland
Chart (2023)	Position
US Billboard 200	65
US Independent Albums (Billboard)	9
US Top R&B/Hip-Hop Albums (Billboard)	26

2024 year-end chart performance for Wasteland
Chart (2024)	Position
New Zealand Albums (RMNZ)	48
US Billboard 200	174
US Top R&B/Hip-Hop Albums (Billboard)	57

== Certifications ==
Certifications for Wasteland
Region	Certification	Certified units/sales
Denmark (IFPI Danmark)	Gold	10,000^{‡}
New Zealand (RMNZ)	Platinum	15,000^{‡}
United Kingdom (BPI)	Gold	100,000^{‡}
United States (RIAA)	Platinum	1,000,000^{‡}
^{‡} Sales+streaming figures based on certification alone.

== Release history ==
Release dates and formats for Wasteland
Region	Date	Label(s)	Format(s)	Edition(s)	Ref.
Various	July 8, 2022	Lost Kids; Venice; Stem	Digital download; streaming	Standard	
United States	June 17, 2023	Lost Kids; Venice; Stem	CD	Standard	
United States	August 18, 2023	Lost Kids; Venice; Stem	LP	Standard	
