= Fuck the World (EP) =

EP by Brent Faiyaz
- Released: February 7, 2020
- Recorded: 2019
- Genre: R&B
- Length: 26:35
- Label: Lost Kids
- Producer: Faiyaz; L3gion; Paperboy Fabe; Los Hendrix; Nascent; Sam Wish; Dpat; Jake One; D Phelps; Freeze; Jariuce Banks; Atu; No I.D.

Brent Faiyaz chronology
Lost (2018)	Fuck the World (2020)	Wasteland (2022)

Singles from Fuck the World
- 1. "Fuck the World (Summer in London)" Released: July 22, 2019; 2. "Rehab (Winter in Paris)" Released: September 21, 2019

Fuck the World is the fourth extended play by American R&B singer Brent Faiyaz, released on February 7, 2020, through Lost Kids. With no guest appearances, the EP's production was primarily handled by Faiyaz, D-Pat, and Atu, known together as Sonder, with assistance from Jake One, Los Hendrix, No I.D., Paperboy Fabe, Sam Wish, and several other producers. He worked on material at home and in Los Angeles New York City, and London. The project serves as a follow-up to Faiyaz's fourth EP, Lost (2018).

== Background and recording ==
In October 2018, Brent Faiyaz released his third extended play (EP), Lost, through Lost Kids. It would be certified gold by Recorded Music NZ (RMNZ). Faiyaz would begin working on new material for a new project. Upon the release of the Fuck the World, Faiyaz appeared in an interview with Vice, Faiyaz shared "Fuck the World to me is embracing the good shit" and that "the overindulgence of sex, money, bullshit but also saying fuck the world. Shit is fucked up. The good shit and the bad shit, the yin and the yang. That's why I like that specific expletive because it can mean both things". In an interview with Complex, Faiyaz stated that "Fuck the World is me finally hitting the point where I really don't give a fuck when it comes to how I approach it creatively". He noted that "if it feels good coming out, then I really don't care about anything else" and that "it's all about just having fun with it". He revealed that all of the songs were made in 2019 and spoke about whether or not he doubts himself during his creative process:

Hell yeah. But I try not to. I don't let it affect creativity. If anything, I doubt myself more after the fact. Like a couple days leading up to it, I'm nervous, like, "Yo, I don't know. I don't know. I don't know." But after it's out, I just don't give a fuck anymore. I'm really just happy to put this shit out. You work on something for so long that you become numb to it. Like, you don't even know how to listen to it because you listened to it so many times.

Similarly to the recording process of Sonder Son (2017), during which he recorded the majority of the album in the Dominican Republic, Faiyaz spent the majority of 2019 abroad in London and Paris. He stated that going overseas influenced his creativity due to the culture shift while revealing that when in London, he attended a Knucks concert on his birthday where he performed "Fuck the World (Summer in London)", stating that Knucks presented him with a birthday cake, "in the states, people don't do shit like that. Someone's not going to cut his set short and present someone with a birthday cake, because some random person pulled up to his show. People don't do shit like that. London has a different kind of love". Faiyaz later went in depth about his experience:

Bro, going overseas is really what influenced this whole shit. We were just working on music, going to the studio, and recording in all these different countries and cities. And I was moving in the fashion spaces, going to shows, and walking in them. Shit like that really just shaped what I was going to be making this new music about. I was constantly peeping the scene, soaking this shit in. And then still going back home and seeing family, so I was seeing the consistency between the places I went and the differences. I paid attention to what I was gaining from people—like the energy I get from people, and also the same things they got from me. The more places I went, the more people were telling me about what they fucked with when it came to my music. They would tell me what they liked, what resonated... You know, this, that, and the third. Now I know what to take and apply to the music. I know my purpose. I know how I'm supposed to create this shit.

In an interview with Billboard, Faiyaz revealed that the project was inspired by Lil Wayne, Tupac Shakur and Kurt Cobain. When asked about the EP's title, Faiyaz said: "You'd be surprised how many people do not give a f–k about [how others feel]. Everything is very one-sided. Either everybody's super happy, super sappy, or like, super heartless. [There's] not really no in-between… I feel like you should talk about everything". In an interview with Rolling Stone, Faiyaz stated that he recorded parts of the project in Los Angeles and New York City while he wrote it in London whenever he'd find time, revealing that some parts were written during fashion week in London and that he put the project together when he returned to L.A. When asked about the story he wanted to tell on the EP, Faiyaz said:

Fuck the world, like, fuck all the negativity. The world is kind of shitty right now — fuck the injustice, the bullshit. Shit is messed up out here. But [I'm] also talking about "fuck the world" from the perspective of lust. "Fuck the world" from an enjoyment perspective. I'm out here getting money, fucking women, all that rock-star shit. I like to use that expletive because it means both things.

== Release and promotion ==
On July 22, 2019, Faiyaz released the EP's lead single, "Fuck the World (Summer in London)". On September 21, he released the EP's second single, "Rehab (Winter in Paris)". On December 25, Faiyaz announced the EP's release date and shared that it will consist of ten songs.

== Critical reception ==
Fuck the World ratings
Aggregate scores
Source	Rating
Metacritic	67/100
Review scores
Source	Rating
AllMusic	3/5 stars
Exclaim!	7/10
Pitchfork	7.5/10
RapReviews.com	6.5/10

According to the review aggregator Metacritic, Fuck the World received "generally favorable reviews" based on a weighted average score of 67 out of 100 from 5 critic scores. AllMusic's Andy Kellman called the project "not quite as malevolent as the title indicates" and "a little more openhearted than Faiyaz's earlier output", though still with "flashes of the cynical outlook and more of the remorseless (if sensitively delivered) slow jams for which he's known." Exclaim!'s A. Harmony wrote that Faiyaz "blends the bitter with the sweet" on the EP where he "perfects his knack for juxtaposition by mixing aggressive, rap-leaning quips with dulcet tones that, together, create a unique sound only he can deliver." Faiyaz "tackles romance-centred songs with compelling specificity. But unlike other R&B albums, his imagination doesn't stop at relationship issues: Faiyaz also explores themes like trauma, depression and self-development, which keeps the album from getting boring." The EP offers "lots to enjoy here for old and new fans alike."

Pitchfork's Alphonse Pierre noted that "there's a lot of slow-groove R&B right now", but that while Faiyaz is "often lumped into this scene ... he doesn't deserve to be" because, unlike other releases in the scene, this EP "starts to sound like a horror story" where "sex is a game and there are no consequences for anything" after listening long enough. Faiyaz is "at his best when he's cold-hearted" and "remarkably consistent as a songwriter" with the project's weakest point being "Soon Az I Get Home (Interlude)", "mostly because of its brevity".

=== Year-end lists ===
Fuck the World on year-end lists
Publication	#	Ref.
Complex	26	
Highsnobiety	10	
NPR Music	36	
Vice	19	

== Commercial performance ==
Fuck the World debuted at number 20 on the US Billboard 200 chart. The EP also debuted at number 12 on the US Top R&B/Hip-Hop Albums chart. On December 8, 2022, the EP was certified gold by the Recording Industry Association of America (RIAA) for combined sales and album-equivalent units of over 500,000 units. To date, the EP has earned 684,000 album-equivalent units and a total of 935.81 million official on-demand streams in the United States.

== Track listing ==
Fuck the World track listing
No.	Title	Writer(s)	Producers	Length
1.	"Skyline"	Christopher Wood; Fabbien Nahounou; Jason Avalos	Faiyaz; Paperboy Fabe; L3gion	2:09
2.	"Clouded"	Wood; Carlos Munoz; Christopher Ruelas; Samuel Wishkoski	Los Hendrix; Nascent; Sam Wish	1:50
3.	"Been Away"	Wood; Munoz; Ruelas; David Patino; Jacob Dutton; James Jeanty; Jariuce Banks; John Key; Jonathan Wells; Wishkoski	Dpat; Jake One; Loshendrix; Nascent; Sam Wish	3:44
4.	"Fuck the World (Summer in London)"	Wood; Patino; Avalos	Faiyaz; Dpat; L3gion	3:57
5.	"Let Me Know"	Wood; Munoz; David Phelps; Banks; Wells	Faiyaz; D Phelps; Freeze; Banks; Loshendrix	3:35
6.	"Soon Az I Get Home"	Wood; Atupele Ndisale; Patino; Gabe Noel	Atu; Dpat	1:35
7.	"Rehab (Winter in Paris)"	Wood; Dion Wilson; Nahounou; Steve Wyreman	Faiyaz; No I.D.	3:00
8.	"Bluffin"	Wood; Ndisale; Patino; Avalos; Playa Fly	Atu; Dpat; L3gion	3:16
9.	"Lost Kids Get Money"	Wood; Avalos	Faiyaz; L3gion	2:58
10.	"Make It Out"	Wood; Munoz; Banks	Banks; Loshendrix	0:31
Total length:				26:35

== Charts ==
2020 chart performance for Fuck the World
Chart (2020)	Peak position
UK Albums (OCC)	70
US Billboard 200	20
US Top R&B/Hip-Hop Albums (Billboard)	12

2023 chart performance for Fuck the World
Chart (2023)	Peak position
Lithuanian Albums (AGATA)	75

== Certifications ==
Certifications for Fuck the World
Region	Certification	Certified units/sales
New Zealand (RMNZ)	Gold	7,500^{‡}
United Kingdom (BPI)	Silver	60,000^{‡}
United States (RIAA)	Platinum	1,000,000^{‡}
^{‡} Sales+streaming figures based on certification alone.
