= Gravity (Brent Faiyaz and DJ Dahi song) =

2021 single by Brent Faiyaz and DJ Dahi featuring Tyler, the Creator

Single by Brent Faiyaz and DJ Dahi featuring Tyler, the Creator

from the album Wasteland
- Released: January 29, 2021
- Genre: R&B; neo-soul
- Length: 3:34
- Label: Lost Kids; Venice; Stem
- Songwriters: Christopher Wood; Dacoury Natche; Tyler Okonma; Steve Lacy
- Producer: DJ Dahi

Brent Faiyaz singles chronology
"Dead Man Walking" (2020)	"Gravity" (2021)	"Eden" (2021)

DJ Dahi singles chronology
"Outro To Q4 (2020)" (2021)	"Gravity" (2021)	"DJ" (2021)

Tyler, the Creator singles chronology
"Automatic Driver (Tyler, The Creator Remix)" (2021)	"Gravity" (2021)	"Tell Me How" (2021)

"Gravity" is a song by American singer Brent Faiyaz and producer DJ Dahi featuring rapper Tyler, the Creator. It was released on January 29, 2021, as the second single from the former's second studio album Wasteland (2022). The song is about the complications of fidelity for a superstar, and was created from music education initiative Songs from Scratch. On March 8, 2021, British-American rapper IDK released a cover of the song.

== Composition ==
The instrumental of the song, produced by DJ Dahi, includes synths, electric guitar (played by guitarist Steve Lacy), "crisp rim shots" and "airy drums", backed by harmonized background vocals and a piano accompaniment. In the chorus, Brent Faiyaz sings about his girlfriend holding him down and waiting him home while the fame has caused them to reevaluate their relationship ("You held me up when I was down and out / But I don't want you waitin' 'round for me"). Faiyaz compares the "force he feels from his girl" to gravity ("She hold me down like gravity"), and Tyler, the Creator raps about how his lover can still count on him despite the consequences of fame. Both Brent and Tyler ask their lovers to move on to someone else so they do not have to keep waiting for them.

== Critical reception ==
Charlie Zhang of Hypebeast wrote that the song "is imbued with a calm soulful groove that emphasizes Faiyaz's distinct R&B-style vocals". Chris DeVille of Stereogum called the song "Woozy and psychedelic without undermining its pop appeal". Jordan Rose of Complex wrote that "the beat is matched perfectly with Brent's vocals and Tyler's verse". Dewayne Gage wrote that the "groovy guitar compliments the mesmerizing bass line" and "the changing pitch of Faiyaz' voice sounds as if Martians have just stepped in the booth to provide ad-libs". He added that the guest verse of Tyler, the Creator makes the track "a timeless-feeling tune about being held down, even if you're in orbit."

== Charts ==
Chart performance for "Gravity"
Chart (2021)	Peak position
Canada Hot 100 (Billboard)	87
Ireland (IRMA)	90
New Zealand Hot Singles (RMNZ)	3
South Africa Streaming (TOSAC)	28
UK Singles (OCC)	60
UK Indie (OCC)	8
US Billboard Hot 100	71
US Hot R&B/Hip-Hop Songs (Billboard)	26
US Rolling Stone Top 100	33

== Certifications ==
Certifications for "Gravity"
Region	Certification	Certified units/sales
New Zealand (RMNZ)	Platinum	30,000^{‡}
United Kingdom (BPI)	Silver	200,000^{‡}
United States (RIAA)	2× Platinum	2,000,000^{‡}
^{‡} Sales+streaming figures based on certification alone.
