= Brent Faiyaz =

American R&B singer (born 1995)

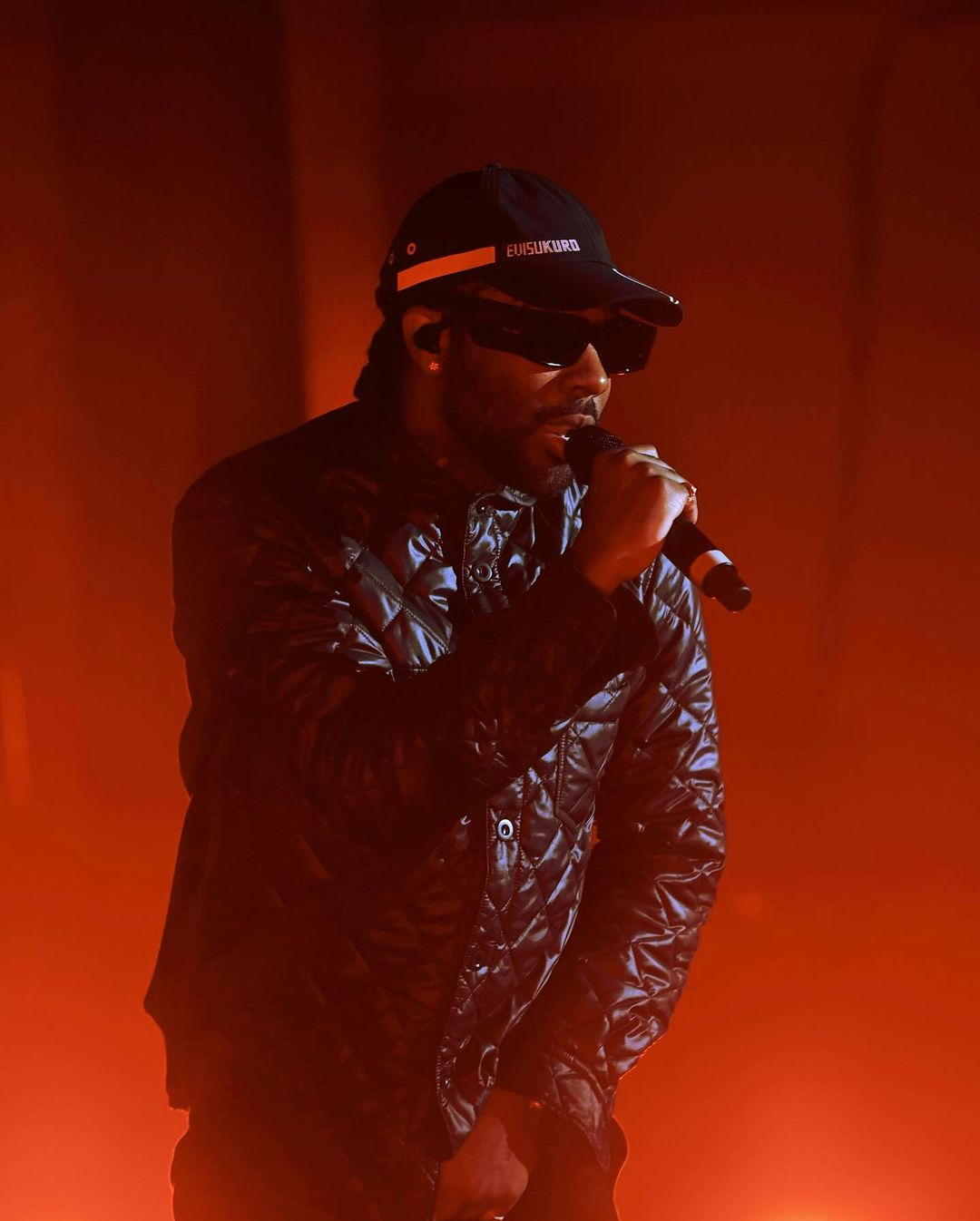
- Faiyaz performing live in Tokyo, Japan, 2024

Background information
- Born: Christopher Brent Wood; September 19, 1995 (age 31); Columbia, Maryland, U.S.
- Genres: R&B; alternative R&B; DMV hip-hop
- Occupations: Singer; songwriter; rapper; record producer
- Works: Discography
- Years active: 2013–present
- Labels: ISO Supremacy (current); Venice; Lost Kids (former)
- Website: brentfaiyaz.com

Christopher Brent Wood (born September 19, 1995), known professionally as Brent Faiyaz, is an American singer, songwriter, rapper, and record producer. Faiyaz rose to prominence with his guest performance alongside Shy Glizzy on GoldLink's 2016 single "Crew". The song peaked at number 45 on the Billboard Hot 100, received octuple platinum certification by the Recording Industry Association of America (RIAA), and was nominated for Best Rap/Sung Performance at the 59th Annual Grammy Awards. The following year, Faiyaz released his debut studio album, Sonder Son (2017). He is noted for his "sly vocals" and "atmospheric slow jam productions," along with occasional rapping.

He first embarked on his musical career in 2013 with the release of his debut extended play (EP), Black Child followed by his second, A.M. Paradox (2016). In 2016, Faiyaz formed the R&B trio Sonder, for which he serves as lead vocalist. In February 2020, Faiyaz released his fourth EP, Fuck the World, which marked his first entry on the Billboard 200, peaking at number 20. His second studio album, Wasteland (2022) peaked at number two on the Billboard 200 and spawned the Billboard Hot 100-charting singles, "Gravity" (with DJ Dahi featuring Tyler, the Creator), "Wasting Time" (featuring Drake and the Neptunes), and "Price of Fame", as well as the TikTok viral single "Dead Man Walking". His debut mixtape, Larger than Life (2023), debuted at number 11 on the Billboard 200 and was met with continued critical praise.In 2024, Faiyaz released his first live album, The Live Experience, which featured performances from his Wasteland and Larger than Life eras.

Along with a Grammy Award nomination, his other nominations include Favorite Male R&B Artist at the American Music Awards in 2022 and Best Male R&B/Pop Artist at the BET Awards in 2023 and 2024. Faiyaz founded the independent creative agency and record label ISO Supremacy in 2023, which has signed fellow DMV native, Tommy Richman.

== Early life ==
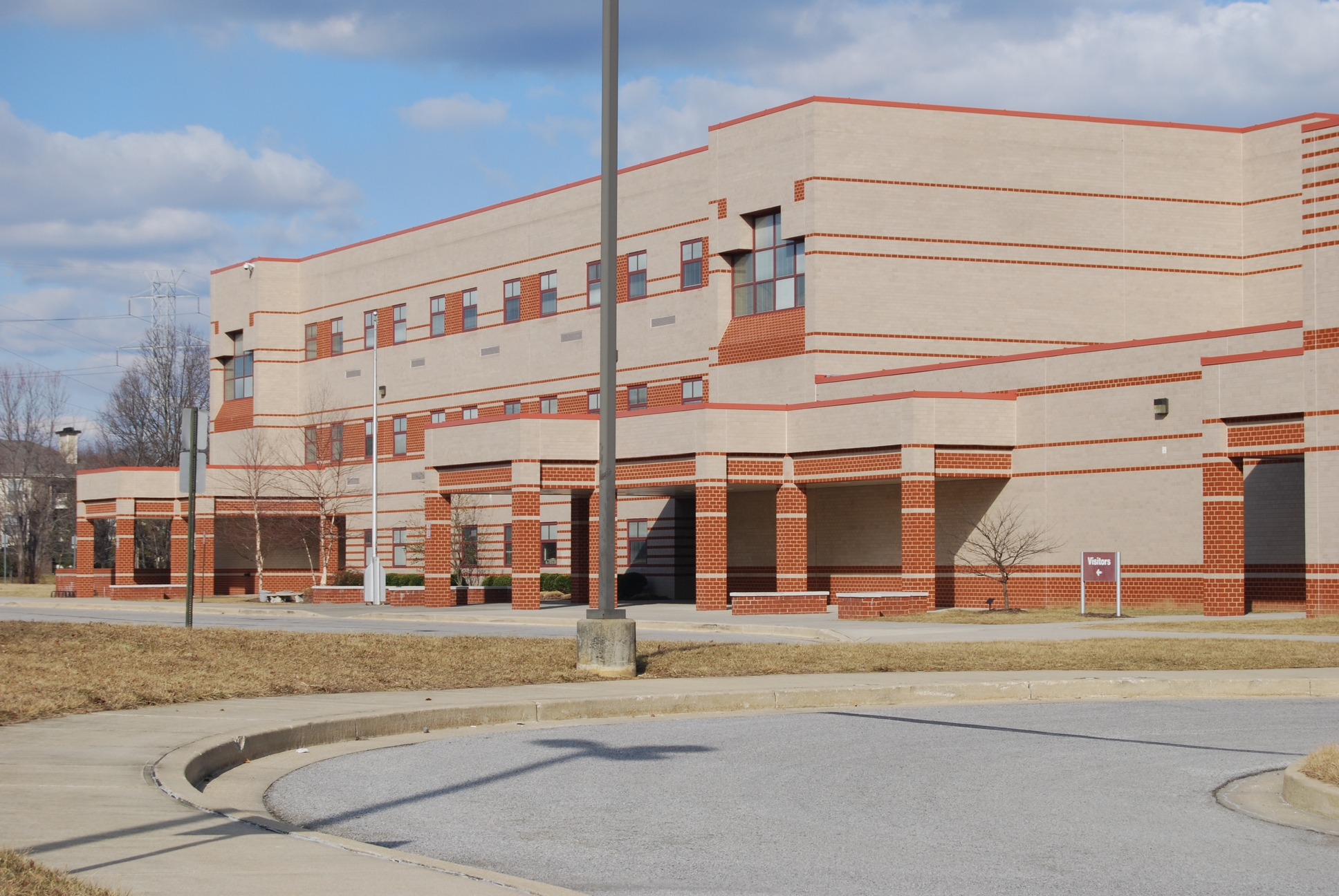
Faiyaz attended Long Reach High School.

Christopher Brent Wood was born on September 19, 1995, in Columbia, Maryland. His father is of Dominican descent, while his mother is African-American. Faiyaz stated in an interview with Billboard, that at the age of six, he was gifted his first play keyboard, leading to him "falling in love" with music. He started producing music at the age of twelve and sold beats to older kids to make money. He often listened to hip-hop after his brother recommended he listen to Ginuwine and Timbaland; he started listening to R&B when he reached high school. Faiyaz attended Long Reach High School, where he graduated at 17. His parents were not always understanding of his dreams as a musician; which Faiyaz said was warranted because his love for music "always distracted" him from school, resulting in his grades being consistently low. In an interview with Vogue, he said: "I was messing up on every other level in my life growing up—whether it was in school or in my jobs". Shortly after graduating, Faiyaz and his family moved to Charlotte, North Carolina. Faiyaz was skeptical about the move initially but soon realized it would only be beneficial and increase his work ethic. Faiyaz revealed to GQ that at the age of eighteen, he moved out of his parents' house because they didn't support his music dreams: "I moved out at 18 because my people got tired of me making so much noise with my recording. My father didn’t like that shit so I had to go. I had to thug it". In 2014, Faiyaz moved to Los Angeles, California, to pursue his music career.

== Career ==
=== 2013–2016: Career beginnings and A.M. Paradox ===
Before the beginning of Faiyaz's official career, around the age of twelve, he would record music in his home, as he had little money. Faiyaz would primarily record hip-hop music as he was more interested in becoming a rapper. Faiyaz released his first EP Sunset Ave. in March 2013. His second EP, Black Child, was released in December of the same year.

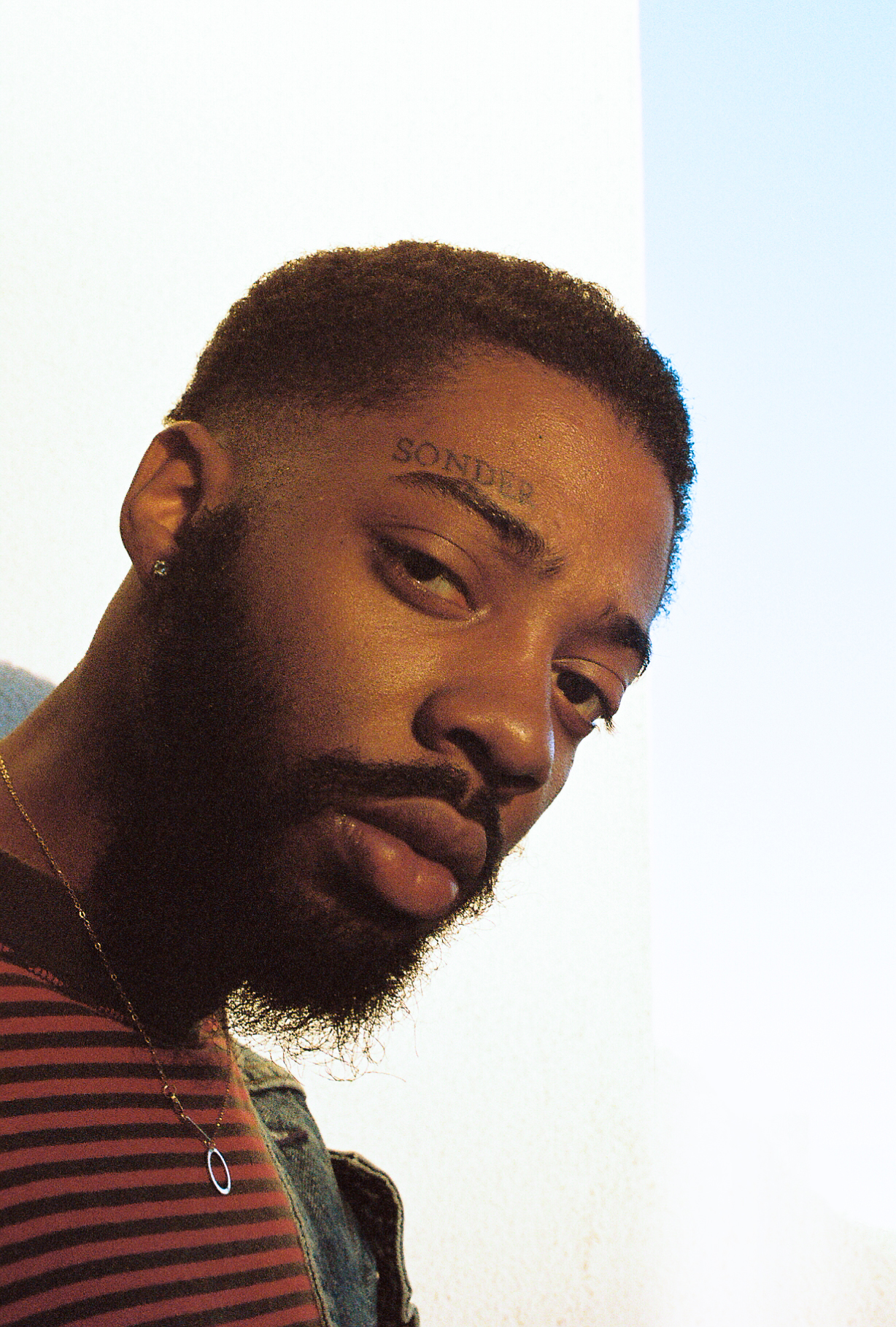
Faiyaz in 2016

Faiyaz began uploading his experimental music onto SoundCloud in 2014. During that time he moved from his hometown Columbia, Maryland, to Charlotte, North Carolina, before settling in Los Angeles, California, to further his music career. While in L.A., Faiyaz met his manager Ty Baisden who supported his dream of succeeding in the music industry independently. On January 19, 2015, he released his debut single "Allure". On June 1, 2016, Faiyaz released "Invite Me", the lead single from his debut commercial EP. On September 19, 2016, his 21st birthday, the EP entitled A.M. Paradox was released and received positive reviews from music critics. The EP was released under Faiyaz's own independent record label, Lost Kids, LLC, which was founded under Baisden's guidance that same year. Faiyaz also signed a publishing deal with Pulse Music Group. In October 2016, Brent Faiyaz formed a group named Sonder with record producers Dpat and Atu. The group released their debut single, "Too Fast," on October 25. On December 16, 2016, Faiyaz was featured alongside rapper Shy Glizzy on the single "Crew" by rapper GoldLink.

=== 2017–2022: Sonder Son, Fuck the World, and Wasteland ===
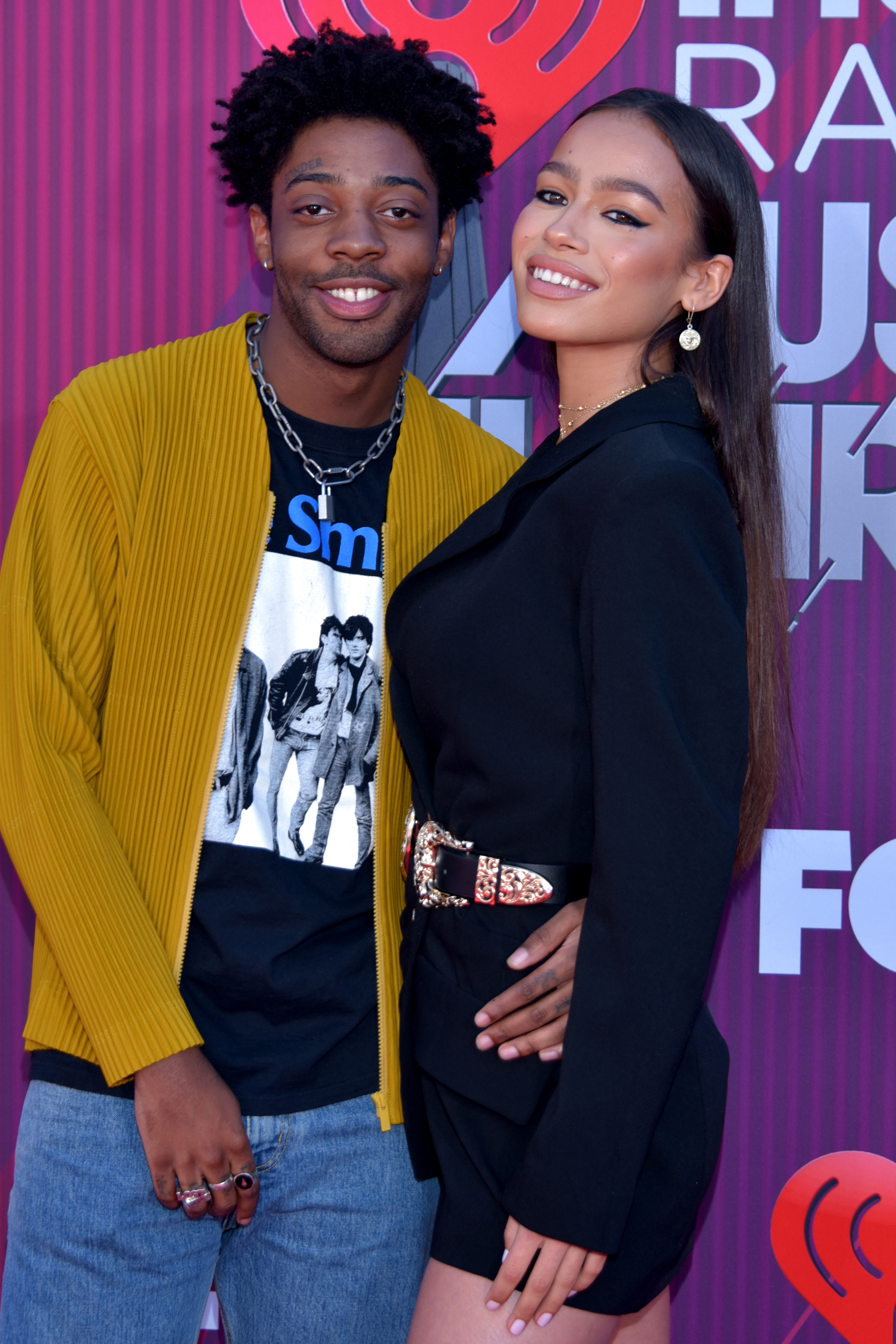
Faiyaz and Zahara Davis at the 2019 iHeartRadio Music Awards Show in Los Angeles, California

On January 26, 2017, Sonder released their debut EP Into, for which Duplion named them their "Artist of the Month" for January 2017. The EP was also ranked 31st by Complex on its list of "The Best Albums of 2017" on December 6, 2017. On June 21, 2017, Faiyaz was featured in the remix for GoldLink's "Crew," which also featured Shy Glizzy and included rapper Gucci Mane. On March 8, 2019, Faiyaz featured on the song "Demonz (Interlude)" from Juice Wrld's second studio album Death Race for Love. On February 7, 2020, Faiyaz released his fourth EP, Fuck the World. The EP peaked at number 20 on the US Billboard 200 and was preceded by two singles, "Fuck the World (Summer in London)", released on July 22, 2019, and "Rehab (Winter in Paris)", released on September 21, 2019. On September 18, 2020, Faiyaz released the single, "Dead Man Walking" which would later appear on his debut studio album. On November 13, Faiyaz appeared alongside Kanye West as a guest appearance on "Feel a Way", the sixth cut of 2 Chainz's sixth studio album, So Help Me God!.

On January 14, 2021, following the launch of PGLang's advertisement campaign for Calvin Klein, Faiyaz co-starred in the advert. On January 29, Faiyaz returned with the single "Gravity" with DJ Dahi featuring Tyler, the Creator, who provides a "spacey" verse, while Faiyaz sings of "uncertain love and raps in a distilled voice praising loyalty from his female companion". On February 8, Faiyaz released the single, "Circles". On June 25, Faiyaz appeared as a guest appearance alongside Fana Hues on "Sweet / I Thought You Wanted to Dance", the tenth cut from Tyler, The Creator's sixth album, Call Me If You Get Lost. On July 1, Faiyaz released the Drake and The Neptunes-assisted single, "Wasting Time". On September 10, Faiyaz appeared on "Lost Souls", the seventeenth cut of Baby Keem's debut album, The Melodic Blue. The following week, on September 15, Faiyaz appeared as a feature on Tems' "Found" from her second EP, If Orange Was a Place. On December 3, Faiyaz released the single "Mercedes", after having teased a project titled Wasteland on Instagram.

On June 17, 2022, Faiyaz officially announced the release of Wasteland for July 8. The following week, on June 24, Faiyaz officially released the album's final single, "Price of Fame". Released according to plan on July 8, 2022, Wasteland was preceded by four singles: "Dead Man Walking", "Gravity", "Wasting Time" and "Price of Fame". Wasteland debuted at number 2 on the US Billboard 200 chart in its first week of release, moving 88,000 album-equivalent units in its first week.

=== 2023–present: Larger than Life and Icon ===
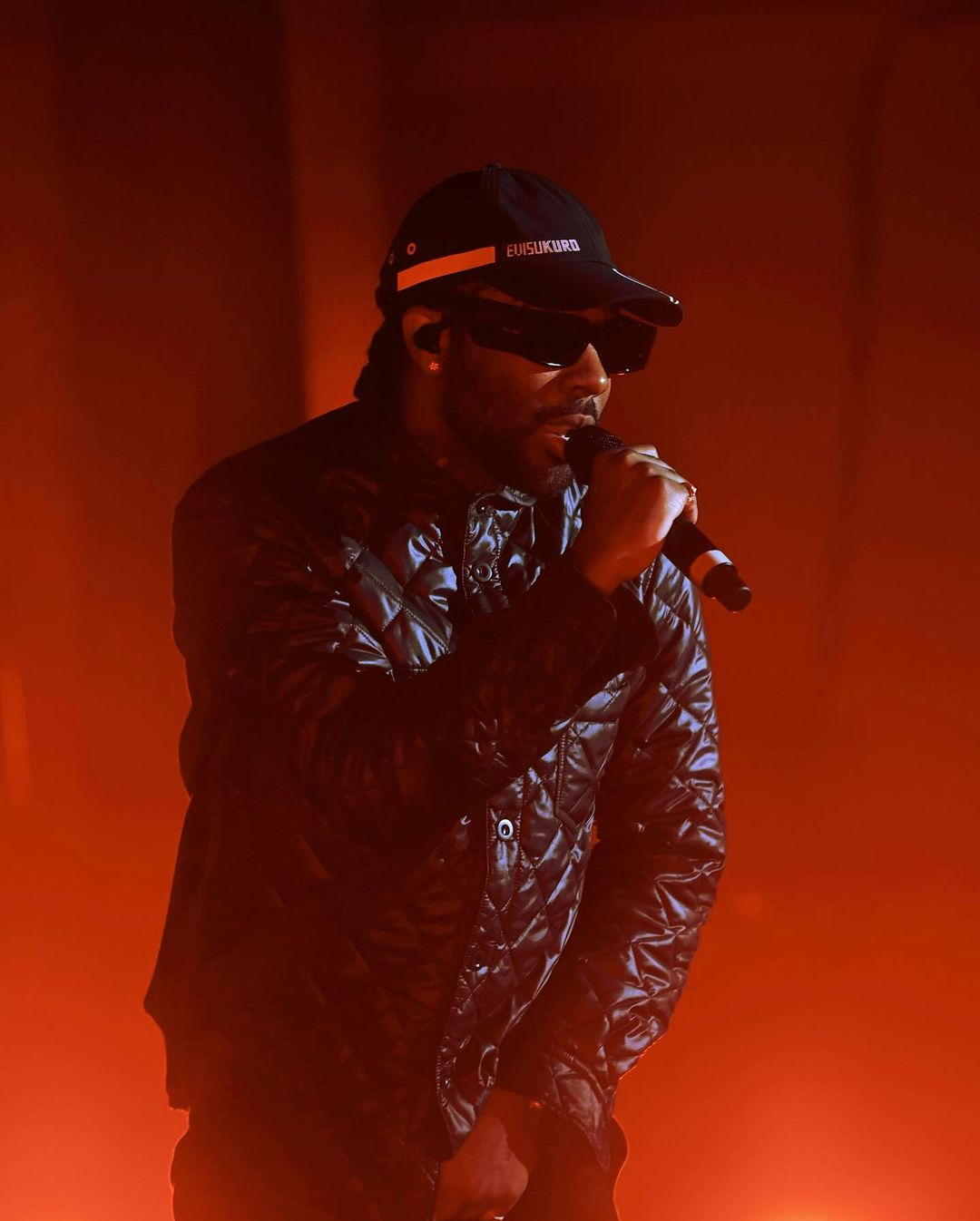
Faiyaz performing live in Tokyo, Japan, 2024

In May 2023, Faiyaz founded his own label and creative agency, ISO Supremacy, in a joint venture deal with UnitedMasters, said to be worth over $50 million. The creative company would sign a joint venture deal with PULSE Records, a subsidiary of Concord Music Group. In an interview with Billboard, Faiyaz spoke on his new record deal:

"My partnership with PULSE Music Group since Day 1 has been transformative. In launching my new label ISO Supremacy and partnering with PULSE Records, we've created this platform to give artists like Tommy Richman a creative home with the ability to scale global impact and a team that is accessible who keeps creativity at the forefront. We're going to continue to make history."

Following Faiyaz's new record deal, he released the Coco Jones-assisted "Moment of Your Life" on August 23, followed by the single "WY@" on September 19. On October 26, Faiyaz released the official trailer for his mixtape Larger than Life which released the following day through ISO Supremacy and distributed by UnitedMasters. The mixtape debuted at number eleven on the Billboard 200, moving 42,000 album-equivalent units in its first week. On December 8, 2023, Brent released the Lone Wolf-directed music video for "Upset", featuring Tommy Richman and FELIX. On December 15, 2023, Brent released a "Chopped Not Slopped" remix of the album with ISO Supremacy and DJ Candlestick. On January 16, 2024, Brent released the OffBucksFilms-directed official music video for "Pistachios". On February 14, Brent released the music video for "WY@", starring Mexican-Kenyan actress, Lupita Nyong'o. The video was purposely set to be released on Valentine's Day due to the song's lyrical topics.

On January 12, 2024, Faiyaz appeared as a guest on "Should've Wore a Bonnet", the twelfth track off of 21 Savage's third album, American Dream. On February 24, the two artists performed the track on NBC's Saturday Night Live. On June 6, Faiyaz appeared on the June 8, 2024, issue of the Billboard magazine. On June 11, Faiyaz was called to present at Billboard's 2024 Indie Power Players event.

On July 3, 2025, Faiyaz announced the release of his third studio album, Icon, set to release on September 19, 2025. The announcement was accompanied by the release of the double single release, "Tony Soprano" and "Peter Pan" on July 4. Faiyaz would appear on Tommy Richman's "Bother Me" released on November 21, 2025 through Iso Supremacy and Pulse Records.

== Artistry ==
=== Influences ===
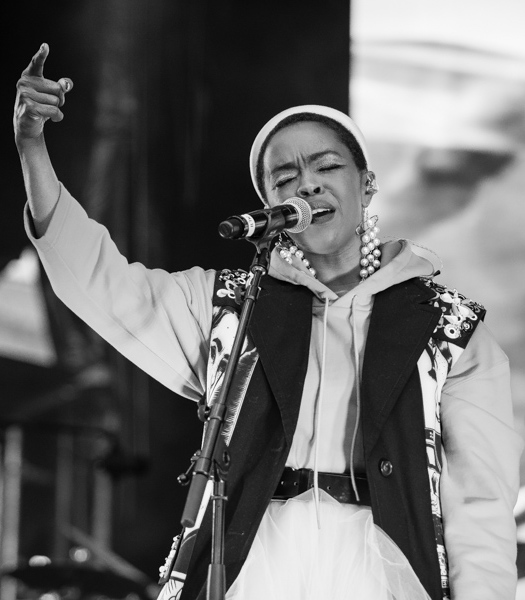
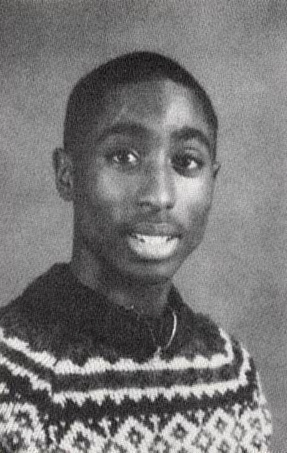
Faiyaz has credited Lauryn Hill (left) and Tupac Shakur (right) as being his biggest musical influences.

Faiyaz has referred to Lauryn Hill as his biggest influence. When speaking to Fact, Faiyaz stated "It was Lauryn Hill who inspired me to start singing from early on". In an interview with Wonderland, Faiyaz revealed that his earliest memory of music was seeing The Miseducation of Lauryn Hill CD on his fireplace during his childhood. He stated that the album has a "seamless blend of R&B and Hip-Hop that became one", noting that it gave him the excuse to follow suit. He cited Alicia Keys and Drake as inspirations.

=== Musical style ===
Faiyaz's music often covers the topics of "infidelity, breakups, and oversharing", resulting in several publications labeling Faiyaz—alongside other artists—a "toxic king". When interviewed on The Angie Martinez Show, Faiyaz said: "I'm inspired by real life". In an interview with Complex, Faiyaz stated that he listens "to a lot of different types of genres," however, he noted that he's an R&B artist because he's "Black, I sing, and I have a soulful voice." Describing his versatility, Faiyaz stated, "I might fuck around and make a reggae album tomorrow."

His earlier songs from his Black Child EP consisted of predominantly Rap music. In particular, Faiyaz specialized in trap soul music, however, as he grew as an artist, he began to ease into his R&B side, allowing elements of hip-hop into his music. Faiyaz stated that music is a form of therapy for him, noting that it's the main reason his music is as deep and as personal as it comes off as. He noted that he "write[s] a lot" and that his writing consists of poetry, day-to-day notes, and music, however, sometimes, he "can go into the studio and not write at all." In an interview with Rolling Stone, Faiyaz stated that he's comfortable recording music wherever he is, stating that he "catch[es] a vibe just naturally". He stated that he gets "stuck on records for a long period of time", leaving him to "sit on it for a little bit". He described his recording process as "very long and drawn-out", noting that that's the primary reason why he takes as long as he does to release his music. Faiyaz has stated that his writing is the most important part of his recording process to him, noting that, "for me, it’s something different when it comes to lyrics. I think that it touches on when a song moves past just music, in terms of the literature". When asked how he'd describe himself as an artist, Faiyaz expressed that he "just put[s] together what [he feels is] a good body of work and what [he] wanted to create and the story [he] wanted to tell".

== Discography ==
- Sonder Son (2017)
- Wasteland (2022)
- Icon (2026)

== Awards and nominations ==
| Year | Organization | Edition | Award | Work | Result | Ref. |
|---|---|---|---|---|---|---|
| 2018 | Grammy Awards | 60th | Best Melodic Rap Performance | "Crew" (with GoldLink and Shy Glizzy) | Nominated | |
| 2019 | iHeartRadio Music Awards | 2019 | Best New R&B Artist | Himself | Nominated | |
| 2022 | American Music Awards | 2022 | Favorite Soul/R&B Male Artist | Himself | Nominated | |
| 2023 | BET Awards | 23rd | Best Male R&B/Pop Artist | Himself | Nominated | |
| 2023 | iHeartRadio Music Awards | 2023 | Best New R&B Artist | Himself | Nominated | |
| 2023 | NAACP Image Awards | 54th | Outstanding Male Artist | Wasteland | Nominated | |
| 2024 | BET Awards | 24th | Best Male R&B/Pop Artist | Himself | Nominated | |
| 2024 | iHeartRadio Music Awards | 2024 | R&B Artist of the Year | Himself | Nominated | |
| 2024 | People's Choice Awards | 49th | R&B Artist of the Year | Himself | Nominated | |
| 2026 | Soul Train Music Awards | 2026 | R&B/Soul Song of The Year | Butterflies | Nominated | |
