= Coco Jones discography =

Discography of American singer

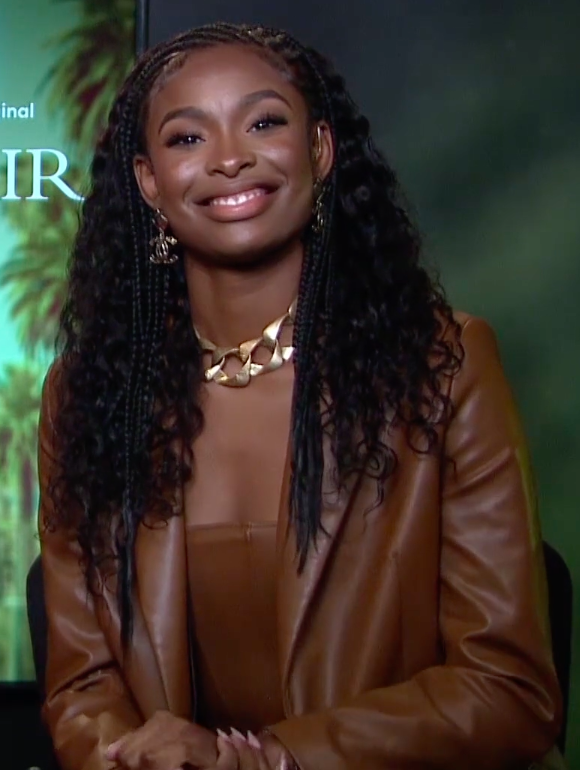
- Coco Jones in 2022
- Studio albums: 1
- EPs: 6
- Singles: 26

American singer Coco Jones has released one studio album, six extended plays, twenty-six singles (including five as a featured artist), as well as several other features on film and television soundtracks. Her first appearance was on her debut independent project, Coco Jones. Soon after she began a concert tour revolving around the theme of anti-bullying called UBU-Stop the Bullying.

Jones signed a record deal with Hollywood Records and began working with Grammy-nominated producer Rob Galbraith, co-writing and recording all-new original music. Jones' debut single "Holla at the DJ" premiered on Radio Disney on December 6, 2012, with its release on iTunes the next day. The video for the track premiered on the Disney Channel on December 12, with a premiere on VEVO just afterwards. Her extended play Made Of was released on March 12, 2013, and toured with Mindless Behavior later that year. Following the release of the EP, Jones worked in the studio with David Banner, Ester Dean, and Jukebox, with plans to release her debut album by August.

In January 2014, Jones was dropped from Hollywood Records, becoming an independent artist. On August 29, 2014, Jones released a lyric video for her debut independent single, "Peppermint". It was officially released on iTunes on September 4, 2014. In November 2017, Jones released the single "Let Me Check It", followed by an EP of the same name. In September 2018, she released a song called "Just My Luck" along with its music video. On September 3, 2019, Jones released a song called "Depressed". On September 20, 2019, she released an 8-track EP titled H.D.W.Y., which included the aforementioned singles.

Jones made a comeback to music in March 2022 with the release of her single "Caliber", after signing with High Standardz and Def Jam Recordings. She then released her fifth EP later in the year on November 4 entitled What I Didn't Tell You, followed by the deluxe edition two months later on January 20, 2023. In April 2023, her song "ICU" entered the Billboard Hot 100, becoming Jones' first entry. She released her debut studio album, Why Not More?, on April 25, 2025.

== Studio albums ==
List of studio albums, with selected details
| Title | Details | Peak chart positions | | Sales |
| Title | Details | US | US R&B/HH | Sales |
|---|---|---|---|---|
| Why Not More? | Released: April 25, 2025; Label: High Standardz, Def Jam; Format: Digital download, streaming, CD, LP | 59 | 16 | US: 100,000 |

== Extended plays ==
List of extended plays, with selected details and chart positions
| Title | Details | Peak chart positions |
| Title | Details | US Heat. |
|---|---|---|
| Coco Jones | Released: October 11, 2010; Label: Self-released; Format: Digital download, streaming | — |
| Made Of | Released: March 12, 2013; Label: Hollywood; Format: CD, digital download, streaming | 10 |
| Let Me Check It | Released: November 17, 2017; Label: Future Mix; Format: Digital download, streaming | — |
| H.D.W.Y. | Released: September 20, 2019; Label: Self-released; Format: Digital download, streaming | — |
| What I Didn't Tell You | Released: November 4, 2022; Label: High Standardz, Def Jam; Format: LP, digital download, streaming | 6 |
| Coco by the Fireplace | Released: November 22, 2024; Label: High Standardz, Def Jam; Format: Digital download, streaming | — |
"—" denotes releases that did not chart or were not released in that territory.

== Singles ==
=== As lead artist ===
| Title | Year | Peak chart positions | | | | | Certifications | Album |
| Title | Year | US | US R&B/ HH | US R&B | US Adult R&B | NZ Hot | Certifications | Album |
|---|---|---|---|---|---|---|---|---|
| "Stand Up" | 2011 | — | — | — | — | — | | Non-album single |
| "What I Said" | 2012 | — (Note: "What I Said" did not enter the Billboard Hot 100, but peaked at number 4 on the Kid Digital Songs chart.) | — | — | — | — | | Let It Shine |
| "Holla at the DJ" | 2012 | — | — | — | — | — | | Made Of |
| "Déjà Vu" | 2013 | — | — | — | — | — | | Made Of |
| "World Is Dancing" | 2013 | — | — | — | — | — | | Made Of |
| "Peppermint" | 2014 | — | — | — | — | — | | Non-album singles |
| "Let 'Em Know" | 2015 | — | — | — | — | — | | Non-album singles |
| "Miss Me When I'm Gone" | 2016 | — | — | — | — | — | | Non-album singles |
| "Let Me Check It" | 2017 | — | — | — | — | — | | Let Me Check It |
| "Just My Luck" | 2018 | — | — | — | — | — | | H.D.W.Y. |
| "Dream" | 2019 | — | — | — | — | — | | Non-album single |
| "Depressed" | 2019 | — | — | — | — | — | | H.D.W.Y. |
| "Hollyweird" | 2020 | — | — | — | — | — | | Non-album single |
| "Caliber" | 2022 | — | — | — | — | — | | What I Didn't Tell You |
| "ICU" (solo or remix featuring Justin Timberlake) | 2022 | 62 | 16 | 6 | 2 | 29 | RIAA: 2× Platinum; RMNZ: Gold | What I Didn't Tell You |
| "Double Back" | 2023 | — | — (Note: "Double Back" did not enter the Hot R&B/Hip-Hop Songs chart, but peaked at number 29 on the R&B/Hip-Hop Airplay chart.) | — | — | — | RIAA: Gold | What I Didn't Tell You |
| "Spend the Night" (with BJ the Chicago Kid) | 2023 | — | — | — | 21 | — | | Gravy |
| "8 Days of Christmas" | 2023 | — | — | — | — | 36 | | Non-album single |
| "Here We Go (Uh Oh)" (solo or remix featuring Leon Thomas III) | 2024 | — (Note: "Here We Go (Uh Oh)" did not enter the Billboard Hot 100, but peaked at number 15 on the Bubbling Under Hot 100 chart.) | 34 | 5 | 1 | — | RIAA: Gold | Why Not More? |
| "Most Beautiful Design" (with London on da Track and Future) | 2024 | — | — | — | — | 38 | | Why Not More? |
| "Taste" | 2025 | — | — (Note: "Taste" did not enter the Billboard Hot R&B/Hip-Hop Songs chart, but peaked at number 18 on the R&B/Hip-Hop Airplay chart.) | 20 | 2 | — | | Why Not More? |
| "You" | 2025 | — | — | — | — | — | | Why Not More? |
| "On Sight" | 2025 | — | — (Note: "On Sight" did not enter the Billboard Hot R&B/Hip-Hop Songs chart, but peaked at number 32 on the R&B/Hip-Hop Airplay chart.) | 18 | — | — | | Why Not More? |
| "Luvagirl" | 2026 | — | — | — | 25 | — | | Non-album singles |
| "Body So Tea" | 2026 | — | — | — | — | — | | Non-album singles |
| "Love Me Through" | 2026 | — | — | — | — | — | | Non-album singles |
"—" denotes releases that did not chart or were not released in that territory.

=== As featured artist ===
List of singles as a featured artist, with selected chart positions, showing year released and album name
| Title | Year | Peak chart positions | | | Certifications | Album |
| Title | Year | US Bub. | US R&B/ HH | NZ Hot | Certifications | Album |
|---|---|---|---|---|---|---|
| "Flyin High" (MattyB featuring Coco Jones) | 2014 | — | — | — | | Non-album singles |
| "Slay" (Nia Sioux featuring Coco Jones) | 2015 | — | — (Note: "Slay" did not enter the Hot R&B/Hip-Hop Songs chart, but peaked at number 21 on the R&B Digital Song Sales chart.) | — | | Non-album singles |
| "I Know You Know" (Ads Valu and Malex featuring Coco Jones) | 2019 | — | — | — | | Non-album singles |
| "Say Their Names" (Devvon Terrell featuring Trey Budden, Coco Jones, Kai Cash, Sydney Renae, Futuristic, Cashflow Harlem, and Kiyanne) | 2020 | — | — | — | | Non-album singles |
| "Moment of Your Life" (Brent Faiyaz featuring Coco Jones) | 2023 | 10 | 36 | 17 | RIAA: Gold | Larger than Life |
"—" denotes releases that did not chart or were not released in that territory.

=== Promotional singles ===
| Title | Year | Album |
|---|---|---|
| "Glitter" (with Katie Armiger) | 2014 | Non-album promotional singles |
| "Chandelier" | 2014 | Non-album promotional singles |
| "Ghost" | 2015 | Non-album promotional singles |
| "Love Is War" | 2022 | Non-album promotional singles |
| "Until the End of Time" (with Leon Thomas) | 2023 | Non-album promotional singles |
| "A Timeless Christmas" | 2023 | Non-album promotional singles |
| "Sweep It Up" | 2024 | Non-album promotional singles |
| "Skip My House" | 2025 | Non-album promotional singles |
| "Lift Every Voice and Sing" (Live) | 2026 | Super Bowl LX Live from Santa Clara, CA |

=== Other charted songs ===
List of other charted songs, with selected chart positions, showing year released and album name
| Title | Year | Peak chart positions | | | Album |
| Title | Year | US R&B | US Afro | NZ Hot | Album |
|---|---|---|---|---|---|
| "Woman Commando" (with Ayra Starr and Anitta) | 2024 | — | 15 | — | The Year I Turned 21 |
| "She Got It" (Teddy Swims featuring Coco Jones and GloRilla) | 2025 | 22 | — | 22 | I've Tried Everything but Therapy (Part 2) |

== Guest appearances ==
List of non-single and album guest appearances, with other performing artists, showing year released and album name
| Title | Year | Other artist(s) | Album |
|---|---|---|---|
| "My Way Home (Original Mix)" | 2010 | Mike Shannon, Brett Johnson & BBQ | My Way Home (Remixes) |
| "Is This Love" | 2011 | —N/a | —N/a |
| "Enjoy Tonight" | 2012 | The Bare Essentials | The Bare Essentials |
| "Whodunit" | 2012 | Adam Hicks | Shake It Up: Live 2 Dance |
| "Don't Push Me" | 2012 | —N/a | Shake It Up: Live 2 Dance |
| "Guardian Angel" | 2012 | Tyler James Williams | Let It Shine |
| "Me and You" | 2012 | Tyler James Williams | Let It Shine |
| "Let It Shine" | 2012 | Tyler James Williams | Let It Shine |
| "Who I'm Gonna Be" | 2012 | —N/a | Let It Shine |
| "Good to Be Home" | 2012 | —N/a | Let It Shine |
| "Around the Block" | 2012 | —N/a | Let It Shine |
| "Joyful Noise" | 2012 | —N/a | Let It Shine |
| "Christmas Night" | 2012 | —N/a | Disney Channel; Holiday Playlist |
| "Freaky Freakend" | 2013 | —N/a | Shake It Up: I <3 Dance |
| "Lights All Over the World" | 2013 | —N/a | Disney Holidays; Unwrapped |
| "Crack the Code" | 2017 | Porsche Smith | Therapy |
| "Fallen Angel" | 2019 | tyDi, Christopher Tin | Collide |
| "LUNA" | 2022 | FKi 1st | Last Player Alive |
| "Simple" | 2022 | Babyface | Girls Night Out |
| "Silver Bells" | 2022 | —N/a | Def the Halls |
| "Grateful" | 2023 | Lil Tjay | 222 |
| "Make It Easy" | 2023 | Adekunle Gold | Tequila Ever After |
| "Reachin'" | 2023 | Diddy, Ty Dolla Sign | The Love Album: Off the Grid |
| "Tummy Hurts (Remix)" | 2023 | Reneé Rapp | Snow Angel (Deluxe) |
| "Ear Candy" | 2024 | Latto | Sugar Honey Iced Tea |
| "Woman Commando" | 2024 | Ayra Starr, Anitta | The Year I Turned 21 |
| "She Got It" | 2025 | Teddy Swims | I've Tried Everything but Therapy (Part 2) |
| "Sideways" | 2026 | Charlie Puth | Whatever's Clever! |
