= Full Moon (Fall in Tokyo) =

Single by Brent Faiyaz

from the album Icon (Director's Cut)
- Released: August 8, 2025 (Original); February 16, 2026 (Official)
- Genre: R&B
- Length: 3:11
- Label: Self-released; ISO Supremacy/UnitedMasters (re-release)
- Songwriters: Clifton Shayne; Christopher Wood; Kenyatta Frazier
- Producers: Clif Shayne; Brent Faiyaz

Music video
- "Full Moon (Fall in Tokyo)" on YouTube

"Full Moon (Fall in Tokyo)" is a song by American R&B singer Brent Faiyaz. Originally released as a YouTube exclusive on August 8, 2025, it was released to streaming services on February 16, 2026 through ISO Supremacy and UnitedMasters. Produced by Faiyaz and Clif Shayne, it contains a sample of "Mewtwo" by Ken Carson. It serves as the third promotion single for Icon following "Tony Soprano" and "Peter Pan"–which were released as a double single on July 4, 2025.

== Background and composition ==
Faiyaz announced his partnership with UnitedMasters, and released his debut mixtape, Larger than Life in 2023. He later went on hiatus, making a guest appearance on American rapper Loe Shimmy's November 2024 remix of "For Me". On July 3, 2025, Faiyaz would clear his Instagram page, suggesting that he was preparing for an album, before posting a picture of what was interpreted as a promotional cover for the album. "Full Moon" serves as a follow up to the project’s first two promotional singles–“Tony Soprano” and “Peter Pan”–which were released as a double single on July 4, 2025. The song is 3 minutes and 11 seconds long, and contains a sample of Ken Carson's "Mewtwo" from his third studio album, A Great Chaos (2023). Its lyrics center around of a romantic rush in a moment that Faiyaz wishes he could be in longer.

== Release and reception ==
Faiyaz would release "Full Moon" on August 8, 2025 as a YouTube exclusive that was made available through his website. HotNewHipHop's Zachary Horvath wrote "The lyrics are simple but the vibes are immaculate." The track later would be released to streaming services on February 16, 2026 through ISO Supremacy and UnitedMasters, off the reissue of Faiyaz's album Icon.
