= Have To (song) =

Single by Brent Faiyaz

from the album Icon
- Released: October 31, 2025
- Genre: R&B
- Length: 3:27
- Label: UnitedMasters; ISO Supremacy
- Songwriters: Christopher Wood; Thomas Richman; Elliot Davy; Jonah Roy; Andrew Kim; David Patino
- Producers: Tommy Richman; 1stFrom92; Jonah Roy; NDK; Dpat

Brent Faiyaz singles chronology
| "Tony Soprano" (2025) | "Have To" (2025) | "Bother Me" (2025) |

Music video
- "Have To" on YouTube

"Have To" (stylized as "Have To.") is a song by American R&B singer Brent Faiyaz released on October 31, 2025, through ISO Supremacy and UnitedMasters as the lead single for his third studio album, Icon (2026). The song was written by Faiyaz, and was produced by Tommy Richman alongside several other record producers. It is a bass-driven R&B track that incorporates elements of neo-soul into its mix. Using a soft and breathy flow, Faiyaz talks about his experience of longing for the presence of a loved one.

Upon its release, "Have To" was met with positive reviews from music critics, who described it as "irresistible" and "sweetly urgent". The song would peak at number one on the Billboard Adult R&B Songs chart. The song was accompanied by a music video directed by Lonewolf that depicts sped-up footage of Faiyaz aboard a private jet.

== Background and release ==
Faiyaz released his debut mixtape, Larger than Life in October 2023 through ISO Supremacy and UnitedMasters. Faiyaz would later appear as a feature on American rapper Loe Shimmy's November 2024 remix of "For Me". In July 2025, Faiyaz wiped his Instagram page on July 3, 2025, suggesting he was preparing for an album and posted a picture that was thought to be a promotional cover for the album. The cover featured the name "Icon" alongside its release date caption, September 19. On July 4, Faiyaz dropped two singles, "Tony Soprano" and "Peter Pan", immediately after the album's announcement. In an interview with Rated R&B's Keithan Samuels, Faiyaz stated that: "This next chapter is about elevation—sonically, visually, and personally. With ‘have to.,’ [I] wanted to strip things down and get honest, to create a space where vulnerability meets confidence. It’s about embracing who I am now, without compromise, and sharing that journey with people who’ve been riding with me since day one.” On October 31, 2025 "Have To" released through ISO Supremacy as the lead single from his album Icon. Alongside an official music video featuring sped-up footage of Faiyaz aboard a private jet. His team said "The night before, Brent sent us a group text pulling the plug on the album". Also confirming that he also had another lead single and video prepared, which were subsequently scrapped.

== Production and composition ==
Faiyaz wrote "Have To" alongside its producers and engineers, Tommy Richman, David Patino, Jonah Roy, NDK, and Elliot Davy, with the latter five also producing the track under their aliases respectively, 1stFrom92, Jonah Roy, NDK, and Dpat. "Have To" is 3 minutes and 27 seconds long. It is a bass-driven R&B song that incorporates elements of neo soul, alternative R&B and DMV hip-hop into its mix. Lyrically, the track showcases Faiyaz longing for his significant other while pursuing his career. Across the track, Faiyaz uses a soft and breathy flow; switching between different pitches, with Andrew Unterberger at Billboard describing it as "Faiyaz basically dueting with himself." According to Flaunt's DeAsia Paige, the song is "drenched in crisp 80s synths that—when paired with Faiyaz’s fuzzy falsetto—sound like a dreamy, exhilarating relationship that sweeps you off your feet."

== Critical reception ==
Andrew Unterberger writing for Billboard wrote that the song was "irresistible" and "is an immaculately produced love song about Faiyaz doing whatever he has to do to be where he needs to be". Describing it as "Sweetly urgent but never overly insistent—and winking enough to avoid any undue sweatiness, including multiple vocal tracks of a pitch-altered Faiyaz basically dueting with himself." While Ty Cole of Revolt felt that the record "signaled a maturation both musically and emotionally." Further explaining "The immersive record finds him stripping things down to their rawest form, pairing moody basslines, layered harmonies."

== Commercial performance ==
"Have To" entered at number 20 on the US Billboard Bubbling Under Hot 100 for a week, while it peaked at 1 on the Billboard Adult R&B Songs chart. On the New Zealand Hot Singles chart, it debuted at number 22, spending one week in the top 40.

== Personnel ==
Credits adapted from Tidal.

- Brent Faiyaz – vocals, songwriting
- Tommy Richman – production
- 1stFrom92 – production
- Jonah Roy – production
- NDK – production
- Dpat – production
- Mike Dean – mastering, mixing, engineering
- Itai Schwartz – mixing, engineering

== Charts ==
Weekly chart performance for "Have To"
| Chart (2025–2026) | Peak position |
|---|---|
| New Zealand Hot Singles (RMNZ) | 22 |
| South Africa Streaming (TOSAC) | 62 |
| US Billboard Hot 100 | 51 |
| US Hot R&B/Hip-Hop Songs (Billboard) | 12 |
| US R&B/Hip-Hop Airplay (Billboard) | 6 |
