= Icon (Brent Faiyaz album) =

Studio album by Brent Faiyaz
- Released: February 13, 2026
- Recorded: 2025
- Genre: R&B
- Length: 33:35
- Labels: ISO Supremacy; UnitedMasters (Note: Despite streaming platforms labelling the album as licensed to UnitedMasters, sources note the company as a distributor for Brent Faiyaz's label, ISO Supremacy.)
- Producers: Raphael Saadiq (exec.); 1stfrom92; Aabo; Ashani Allick; Benny Blanco; Berg; Brent Faiyaz; Dilip; Dpat; Chad Hugo; Dylan Hyde; Andrew Kim; Legion; Paperboy Fabe; Tommy Richman; Jonah Roy; Jordan Ware; Noah Williamson; Mathias Yung

Brent Faiyaz chronology
Larger than Life (2023)	Icon (2026)

Director's Cut Cover

Singles from Icon
- 1. "Full Moon (Fall in Tokyo)" Released: August 8, 2025; 2. "1 for You (Spring in New York)" Released: September 5, 2025; 3. "Have To" Released: October 31, 2025

Icon is the third studio album by American musician Brent Faiyaz. It was released on February 13, 2026, through ISO Supremacy and UnitedMasters, as the follow-up to his second studio album, Wasteland (2022) and his debut mixtape, Larger than Life (2023). Faiyaz had recorded most of the album in 2025. With no guest appearances, the album's production was handled by Faiyaz, Benny Blanco, Chad Hugo, Sonder's Dpat, Paperboy Fabe, Tommy Richman, and Raphael Saadiq, among several other producers.

In promotion for the album, Faiyaz released two singles, "Tony Soprano" and "Peter Pan", on July 4, 2025, both of which would make an appearance on the New Zealand Hot Singles chart. On September 18, the album's release was delayed. Icon was supported by one single "Have To", which peaked at number 1 on the Adult R&B Songs chart. Upon release, Icon received generally favorable reviews from music critics.

== Background and recording ==
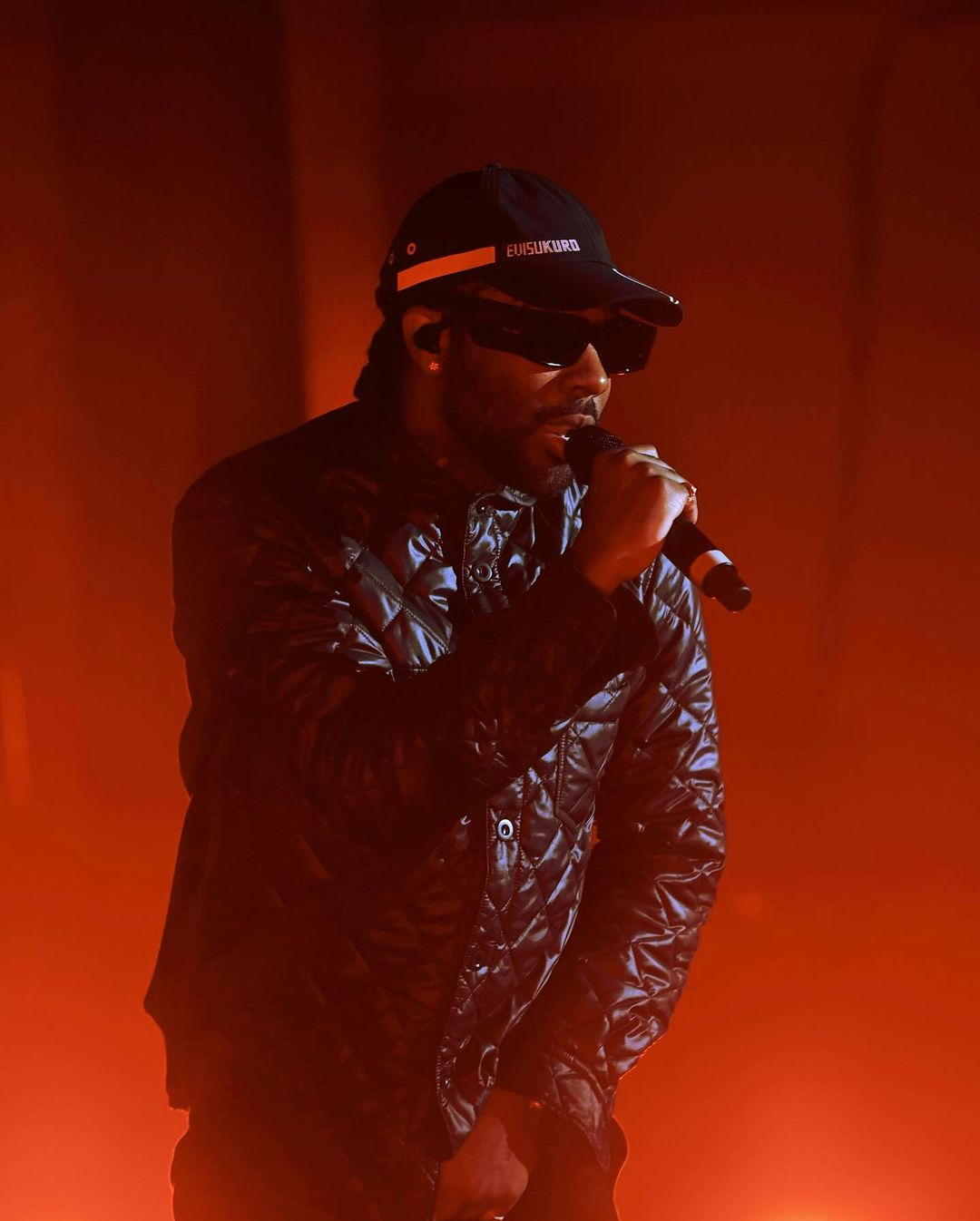
Faiyaz performing in Tokyo, Japan, in 2024

In October 2023, Brent Faiyaz released his debut mixtape, Larger than Life through ISO Supremacy and UnitedMasters. It would debut at number eleven on the Billboard 200, advancing 42,000 album-equivalent units in its first week. Larger Than Life had received generally positive reviews from critics who had highlighted Faiyaz's vocals. Following the release of the mixtape, Faiyaz went on hiatus and later appeared as a feature on American rapper Loe Shimmy's November 2024 remix of "For Me". In May 2025, controversy erupted between Halle Bailey and DDG, alleging Faiyaz had an affair with Bailey. Faiyaz started working on material for Icon in 2025, and scheduled it to release on September 19, 2025. Faiyaz's team stated "The night before, Brent sent us a group text pulling the plug on the album, he also had another lead single and music video." Further explaining, "He scrapped those too, then sent us 'this' [...] with ‘this’ being “have to.” In an interview with Rolling Stone, Faiyaz noted, “Everything I’m creating right now is about showing [a] range of concepts, principles, emotions, and experiences. Innocence versus Indecency. Vulnerability versus guardedness. These tracks capture the core of that.” The production was handled by multiple record producers, including Raphael Saadiq, Chad Hugo, Paperboy Fabe, Dpat, Dilip, Tommy Richman, L3gion, and Benny Blanco.

== Composition ==
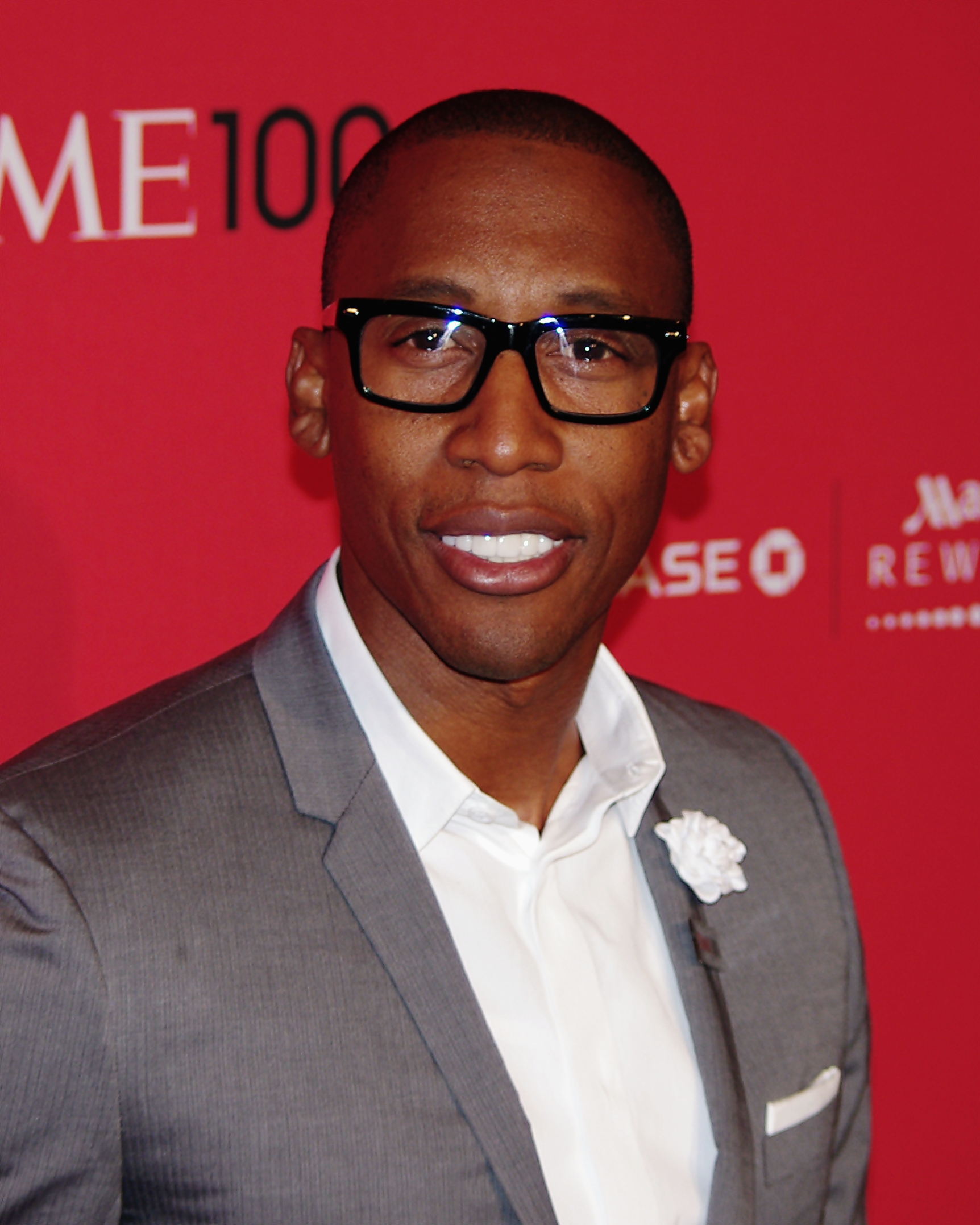
Raphael Saadiq was one of the producers who contributed to the creation of Icon.

=== Overview ===
Icon is an R&B album, that incorporates elements of nu-disco. Characterized by its 90's style, Icon features an electronic sound, with Faiyaz's pitched vocals supported by keyboards, guitars and horns. Rated R&B's Keithan Samuels had felt that "Faiyaz shifts away from the “toxic R&B” he’s known for, toward songs that lean into love’s merrier side."

=== Tracks ===
The opening instrumental track, "White Noise", beginning with a "cinematic, string‑heavy intro", is layered with "moody" harmonies with a deep, brooding bass, creating a grand, "atmospheric" introduction. According to Nina Corcoran writing for the online music magazine Pitchfork, "World is Yours,” draws inspiration from earlier R&B artists, "channeling Michael Jackson’s power and sincerity [...] while crooning over nu-disco, dusty ’80s toms, and twinkling guitar that recalls the best of ’90s Usher." While the Icon’s lead single, "Have To", which according to DeAsia Paige at Flaunt, is "drenched in crisp 80s synths that—when paired with Faiyaz’s fuzzy falsetto—sound like a dreamy, exhilarating relationship that sweeps you off your feet." Zakaria Mafa writing for Stanisland Magazine said that Faiyaz "works within a canvas of honesty and introspective elements, gravitating toward a biotic soundscape."

== Release and promotion ==
Faiyaz cleared his Instagram page on July 3, 2025, suggesting he was preparing for an album before posting a picture of what was interpreted as a promotional cover for Icon. The cover featured the name "Icon" alongside its release date caption, September 19. On July 4, Faiyaz dropped two promotional singles, "Tony Soprano" and "Peter Pan", immediately after the album's announcement. In an interview with Rolling Stone, Faiyaz stated that with the two-pack, he's "embracing duality" as the former is about "tapping into that leader mentality" while the latter is "outside of all that, free from limits" and is "full of wonder". On August 8, 2025, Faiyaz released "Full Moon" as the third promotional single and a YouTube exclusive. Later in September 2025, he released "If. (Spring in New York)".

A few months later, on October 31, Faiyaz released the Icon's lead single "Have To", explaining the reason for the album's delayed release in the intro of the music video. On the Billboard Adult R&B Songs chart, "Have To" peaked at number 1, marking Faiyaz's top entry on chart. On February 3, 2026, Faiyaz shared the official album trailer revealing a release date of February 13, and multiple posts regarding the album on Instagram. Later that day, Faiyaz shared Icon's official tracklist, with its producer and personnel list. Faiyaz had officially announced the album; pre-orders for CDs and vinyl were made available. Icon was released on February 13 through ISO Supremacy and UnitedMasters; a music video for "Wrong Faces", filmed by Cole Bennett was released concurrently. On February 16, 2026, Faiyaz dropped Icon (Director's Cut), an expanded edition of Icon. It includes two additional tracks "Full Moon (Fall in Tokyo)" and "1 For You (Spring in New York)".

== Critical reception ==
Professional ratings
Review scores
Source	Rating
Pitchfork	5.8/10

Upon release, Icon had received generally favorable reviews from critics. Jem Aswad of Variety wrote that Icon was "musically versatile and multifaceted that [you] can play it over and over without getting tired of it." He had also compared Faiyaz's "multi-tracked" voice to the "best works" of American musicians Mary J. Blige, Prince, and Beyonce. While HotNewHipHop's Tallie Spencer wrote that "Sonically, [Icon] continues [his] exploration of vulnerability wrapped in ego, a balance that resonates deeply with his fanbase. The album reinforces his positioning as both a cult favorite and mainstream R&B disruptor."

Writing for Exclaim, Kayla Torres wrote "each song brings something new, toggling between sultry mid-tempo grooves, intimate ballads and semi-acoustic textures. Throughout Icon, Faiyaz is reminiscent of a range of influences: Prince's experimental flair, D'Angelo's neo-soul smoothness, Usher's R&B polish, and dare I say I hear some MJ in there, too." Staff at Complex noted "the album blends classic soul foundations with forward-thinking R&B". While Alphonse Pierre of Pitchfork wrote "The R&B singer pivots from clubrat deviance to domestic devotion. When he leans into the honesty and specificity of his player music, he makes love feel like more than just a catalyst for a rebrand." NPR's Sheldon Pearce stated "The dramatic about-face toward an '80s template on [this] album ultimately masks a regression in the songwriting, from a signature POV to historical cosplay."

== Track listing ==
All tracks are written by Christopher Wood, with additional writers noted.

Icon track listing
No.	Title	Producer(s)	Length
1.	"White Noise"	Brent Faiyaz; Dpat; Jordan Ware; Paperboy Fabe	2:12
2.	"Wrong Faces"	Dpat; Berg; Dilip; Mathias Yung	3:43
3.	"Have To"	Dpat; Andrew Kim; Jonah Roy; Noah Williamson; Tommy Richman	3:27
4.	"Butterflies"	Dpat; 1stfrom92; Benny Blanco; Legion	4:08
5.	"Other Side"	Benny Blanco; Roy	3:15
6.	"Strangers"	Faiyaz; Ware; Roy; Ashani Allick	3:16
7.	"World Is Yours"	Faiyaz; Dpat; Chad Hugo	4:05
8.	"Four Seasons"	Dpat; Kim; 1stfrom92; Dylan Hyde; Hugo	3:05
9.	"Pure Fantasy"	Dpat; Roy; Aabo	4:00
10.	"Vanilla Sky"	Faiyaz; Kim; 1stfrom92	2:23
Total length:			33:35

Icon (Director's Cut) track listing
No.	Title	Writer(s)	Producer(s)	Length
11.	"Full Moon (Fall in Tokyo)"	Kenyatta Frazier Jr.^{[a]}; Clifton Shayne^{[a]}	Faiyaz	3:12
12.	"1 for You (Spring in New York)"	Kelly Rowland^{[b]}; Beyoncé Knowles^{[b]}; Michelle Williams^{[b]}; Dana Stinson^{[b]}; Charles Jackson^{[b]}; Marvin Yancy^{[b]}; Tenitra Williams; Juanita Wynn; Shanell Irving; Tenesha Blacks	Jordan Ware; Legion; Ashani Allick; MikeBlud; SpizzleDoe	2:41
13.	"Fallin'"			2:47
14.	"Like It Was"			3:20
15.	"Suave" (with Tokischa)			3:21
Total length:				48:56

Notes

- All tracks are stylized in lowercase and end with a period.

Sample and interpolation credits

- "Other Side" contains an interpolation from "Signs", written by Calvin Broadus, Pharrell Williams, Chad Hugo, Justin Timberlake, Charlie Wilson, Lonnie Simmons, and Rudy Taylor, as performed by Snoop Dogg, Charlie Wilson, and Justin Timberlake.
- ^{^[a]} "Full Moon (Fall in Tokyo)" contains a sample from "Mewtwo", written by Kenyatta Frazier Jr. and Clifton Shayne, as performed by Ken Carson.
- ^{^[b]} "1 for You (Spring in New York)" contains a sample from "If", written by Kelly Rowland, Beyoncé Knowles, Michelle Williams, Dana Stinson, Big Drawers, Charles Jackson, and Marvin Yancy as performed by Destiny's Child.

== Personnel ==
Credits adapted from Tidal.

- Brent Faiyaz – vocals, songwriting, production
- Itai Schwartz – mixing, vocal engineering
- Mike Dean – mastering
- Tommy Rush – immersive mixing

== Charts ==
Weekly chart performance
Chart (2026)	Peak position
Australian Albums (ARIA)	19
Australian Hip Hop/R&B Albums (ARIA)	4
Austrian Albums (Ö3 Austria)	40
Belgian Albums (Ultratop Flanders)	68
Belgian Albums (Ultratop Wallonia)	108
Canadian Albums (Billboard)	19
Danish Albums (Hitlisten)	22
Irish Albums (IRMA)	78
Irish Independent Albums (IRMA)	6
Lithuanian Albums (AGATA)	15
New Zealand Albums (RMNZ)	12
Norwegian Albums (IFPI Norge)	52
Portuguese Albums (AFP)	9
Spanish Albums (Promusicae)	98
Swedish Albums (Sverigetopplistan)	41
Swiss Albums (Schweizer Hitparade)	9
UK Albums (Official Charts)	28
US Billboard 200	6
US Independent Albums (Billboard)	2
US Top R&B/Hip-Hop Albums (Billboard)	3

== Release history ==
Release dates and formats for Icon
Region	Date	Label(s)	Format(s)	Edition(s)	Ref.
Various	February 13, 2026	ISO Supremacy; UnitedMasters	Digital download; streaming	Standard	
Various	February 13, 2026	ISO Supremacy; UnitedMasters	CD; LP; cassette	Standard	
