= Tony Soprano (song) =

2025 single by Brent Faiyaz

Single by Brent Faiyaz
- Released: July 4, 2025
- Genre: R&B
- Length: 3:02
- Label: ISO Supremacy; UnitedMasters
- Songwriter: Christopher Wood
- Producers: Hardheaded; Chidozie Arah; Anthony Rampias; Jordan Ware; Jason Avalos; Elliot Davy; Emmanuel Arah; Eman

Brent Faiyaz singles chronology
"Peter Pan" (2025)	"Tony Soprano" (2025)	"Have To" (2025)

"Tony Soprano" (stylized in all lowercase "tony soprano.") is a song by American R&B singer Brent Faiyaz. It was released on July 4, 2025 alongside his song "Peter Pan" as promotion for his third studio album, Icon. It was produced by Hardheaded, Chidozie Arah, Anthony Rampias, Jordan Ware, Jason Avalos, Elliot Davy, Emmanuel Arah and Eman. The song is named after the main character of the television series The Sopranos.

== Background and release ==
Faiyaz announced his new partnership with UnitedMasters and released his debut mixtape, Larger Than Life, released via his label ISO Supremacy, in partnership with UnitedMasters. He later appeared as a feature on 21 Savage's "Should’ve Wore a Bonnet", Wizkid's "Piece of My Heart", and Loe Shimmy's November 2024 remix of "For Me". In regard to "Tony Soprano" and "Peter Pan", Faiyaz stated "Everything I'm creating right now is about showing [a] range of concepts, principles, emotions, and experiences. Innocence versus Indecency. Vulnerability versus guardedness. These tracks capture the core of that."

== Composition ==
The song finds Faiyaz performing in melodic rap-style vocals, as he laments the negative aspects of fame and success, such as women who engage with him for only their own interests. He also takes comfort in what he can provide for himself.

== Charts ==
Chart performance for "Tony Soprano"
Chart (2025)	Peak position
New Zealand Hot Singles (RMNZ)	15
US Bubbling Under Hot 100 (Billboard)	21
US Hot R&B/Hip-Hop Songs (Billboard)	28
