= Moment of Your Life =

2023 single by Brent Faiyaz

Single by Brent Faiyaz featuring Coco Jones

from the album Larger than Life
- Released: August 24, 2023
- Genre: R&B
- Length: 3:14
- Label: ISO Supremacy; UnitedMasters
- Songwriters: Christopher Wood; Courtney Jones; David Patino; Donald Holmes; Emmanuel Arah; Gerard Thomas; Melissa Elliott; Terrance Davis; Nicole Wray
- Producers: Dpat; Mannyvelli; Sparkheem

Brent Faiyaz featuring Coco Jones singles chronology
"Fell in Love" (2023)	"Moment of Your Life" (2023)	"WY@" (2023)

Coco Jones singles chronology
"ICU (Remix)" (2023)	"Moment of Your Life" (2023)	"Spend the Night" (2023)

"Moment of Your Life" is a song by American R&B singer Brent Faiyaz featuring American singer and actress Coco Jones. It was released through ISO Supremacy and UnitedMasters on August 24, 2023, as the lead single from Faiyaz's debut mixtape, Larger than Life. It was written by the artists alongside producers Dpat, Mannyvelli and Sparkheem. It charted on Billboard's Bubbling Under Hot 100 and Hot R&B/Hip-Hop Songs charts, and on Recorded Music NZ's New Zealand Hot Singles chart. It contains a sample of "Boy You Should Listen" by Nicole Wray.

== Production and composition ==
Faiyaz wrote "Moment of Your Life" alongside Coco Jones and its producers and engineers, Sparkheem, Dpat, Mannyvelli. The song depicts the singers as lovers looking to spend a memorable evening together, particularly one that involves sex. It opens with Brent Faiyaz admiring his partner's beauty and desiring an intimate encounter. He wants to tell other women about the pleasures of the moment so they would follow her example. Coco Jones sings from the woman's perspective, complimenting him as well and showing her promiscuous side even though she seems to be a well-behaved person. The bridge features a call and response section between the two.

== Critical reception ==
Zachary Horvath of HotNewHipHop wrote that the song's theme is "brought up a lot, especially in R&B music, but this cut is so well done. It runs just over three minutes but Brent Faiyaz and Coco Jones fill out the time perfectly." Elaina Bernstein of Hypebeast remarked "Faiyaz and Jones have an otherworldly musical compatibility, evident in the pair's effortless ability to layer and complement one another silky-smooth vocals throughout the three-minute track. Both artists' buttery vocals blend together on the chorus: 'And I got every other thing that I need and want but you / And I've been wanting you, so what you wanna do / Tonight? / Make this the moment of your life.'"

== Charts ==
Chart performance for "Moment of Your Life"
Chart (2023)	Peak position
New Zealand Hot Singles (RMNZ)	17
US Bubbling Under Hot 100 (Billboard)	10
US Hot R&B/Hip-Hop Songs (Billboard)	36

== Certifications ==
Region	Certification	Certified units/sales
United States (RIAA)	Gold	500,000^{‡}
^{‡} Sales+streaming figures based on certification alone.
