= Gillie da Kid =

American rapper and podcaster (born 1984)

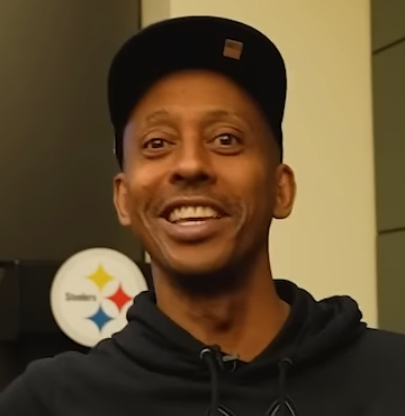
- Fard in 2025

Background information
- Also known as: Far'd Nasir; Gillie da King
- Born: January 1, 1984 (age 42); North Philadelphia, Pennsylvania, US
- Genre: Hip-hop
- Occupations: Rapper, podcaster
- Years active: 1999–2017 (rapper); 2017–present (podcaster)
- Labels: RuffNation (with Major Figgas); Cash Money (until 2006)
- Formerly of: Major Figgas

Nasir Fard (born January 1, 1984), known professionally as Gillie da Kid and formerly Gillie da King, is an American podcaster and former rapper. He and his cousin Wallo267 (or simply Wallo) host the podcast Million Dollaz Worth of Game.

== Career ==
=== 1999–2010: music career and acting ===
Fard was born on January 1, 1984, in North Philadelphia, Pennsylvania. Formerly known as Gillie Da King, he was a member of Major Figgas from 1999 to 2003. The group was signed to RuffNation Records from 2000 to 2003, and released the album Figgas 4 Life under the label, which charted. He later signed to Cash Money Records, before leaving in 2006, not releasing music during the deal. Fard later claimed he ghostwrote for Lil Wayne on Tha Carter, which caused a feud between the two.

In 2010, Fard starred in the film Caged Animal, alongside Ving Rhames, Nipsey Hussle, and Robert Patrick.

=== 2017–present: podcasting ===
In 2017, Fard, alongside Wallace "Wallo267" Peeples—his cousin and groupmate in Major Figgas who served 20 years in prison for armed robbery—began the podcast Million Dollaz Worth of Game, which airs on Barstool Sports. He was introduced to Barstool owner Dave Portnoy through Adam Ferrone (Rone), one of Barstool's podcasters from Philadelphia who was a fan of Gillie's. The podcast has featured basketball player Tyrese Maxey, football coach Deion Sanders and rapper Ice Cube, among others.

In July 2023, Fard's son Devin Spadey—known by his stage name YNG Cheese—was murdered in Olney, Philadelphia. In February 2025, Fard claimed, to the objection of the Philadelphia Police Department, the perpretrator was Noah Scurry, a basketball player for Samuel S. Fels High School who himself was murdered on January 14. In July 2024, on the one-year anniversary of his son's death, Fard purchased a billboard in Times Square to commemorate him.

Fard is an unofficial hype man for the Philadelphia Eagles. Dressed in oversized Eagles merchandise, he ran out of the tunnel with the team, as well as leading dances to Too Short's song "Blow the Whistle", with Too Short himself joining in one. During this time he was nicknamed "Chauncey Gillups", a play on basketball player Chauncey Billups.

== Discography ==
- Million Dollars Worth of Game (2017)
- Welcome To Gilladelphia (2015)
- I Am Philly (2009)
- King of Philly (2008)
