= Outside All Night =

2023 song by Brent Faiyaz

Song by Brent Faiyaz (featuring N3wyrkla and ASAP Rocky)

from the album Larger than Life
- Released: October 27, 2023
- Genre: Hip-hop; R&B
- Length: 3:22
- Label: ISO Supremacy; UnitedMasters
- Songwriters: Christopher Wood; Nyla Nasir; Rakim Mayers
- Producer: Jonah Roy

"Outside All Night" is a song by American singer-songwriter and rapper Brent Faiyaz featuring American rappers ASAP Rocky and N3wyrkla. It was released through ISO Supremacy and UnitedMasters on October 27, 2023 as the seventh track off his debut mixtape Larger than Life. "Outside All Night" had peaked at number one on the US Billboard Bubbling Under Hot 100 chart. It also received a gold certification from the Recording Industry Association of America (RIAA).

== Background and recording ==
In an Interview with Notion, Nasir would state that she had "connected with Faiyaz" after he listened to some of her music. She would go into further detail, explaing that "I had flown to L.A. for him to hop on 'not enough' while he was working on his album Larger Than Life. He ended up wanting to do another song, so that’s how ‘Outside All Night’ came about." Nasir also expressed that "I didn’t know Rocky was gonna be on the song until he pulled up and Brent played the record for him. It definitely was inspiring working with two artists’ I’m a fan of and seeing how they work/record."

== Charts ==
Weekly chart performance for "Outside All Night"
Chart (2023)	Peak position
US Bubbling Under Hot 100 (Billboard)	1
US Hot R&B/Hip-Hop Songs (Billboard)	26
US Hot R&B Songs (Billboard)	10
New Zealand Hot Singles (RMNZ)	8

== Certifications and sales ==
Certifications for "Outside All Night"
Region	Certification	Certified units/sales
United States (RIAA)	Gold	500,000^{‡}
^{‡} Sales+streaming figures based on certification alone.
