= Why Not More? =

2025 studio album by Coco Jones

Studio album by Coco Jones
- Released: April 25, 2025
- Recorded: 2023–2025
- Genre: R&B
- Length: 41:58
- Labels: High Standardz; Def Jam
- Producers: 2K; Al Cres; Banger Slanger; Boobie; Cardiak; Larrance Dopson; Cirkut; Ezzra; Jasper Harris; Hero; Eric Hudson; Happy Perez; Ikey; Cheyenne Lavene; Tom Levesque; Alexander Lewis; London on da Track; Mars; M-Phazes; Carl Paul; Phil the Keys; Poo Bear; Protoje; Presley Regier; Sam Wish; Aaron Shadrow; Stargate; Swiff D; Wu10

Coco Jones chronology
Coco by the Fireplace (2024)	Why Not More? (2025)

Singles from Why Not More?
- 1. "Here We Go (Uh Oh)" Released: May 3, 2024; 2. "Most Beautiful Design" Released: October 18, 2024; 3. "Taste" Released: February 21, 2025; 4. "You" Released: March 28, 2025; 5. "On Sight" Released: June 3, 2025

Why Not More? is the debut studio album by American actress and singer-songwriter Coco Jones, released on April 25, 2025, by Def Jam. The album features guest appearances from Future and YG Marley. Production was handled by various producers, including Stargate, Cardiak, Eric Hudson, M-Phazes, Cirkut, Sam Wish, Happy Perez, London on da Track, Protoje, and Larrance Dopson from 1500 or Nothin', amongst others.

The album received acclaim from music critics, with many of whom praising Coco's vocal delivery and the album's cohesiveness and production. At the 68th Annual Grammy Awards it was nominated for Best R&B Album. The album was supported by five singles: "Here We Go (Uh Oh)", "Most Beautiful Design", "Taste", "You", and "On Sight"; of which the former received a Gold certification by the Recording Industry Association of America (RIAA). It reached number fifty nine on the US Billboard 200. A digital special edition of the album titled Why Not More? (More!), was released on August 15, 2025.

== Critical reception ==
Professional ratings
Review scores
Source	Rating
NME	4/5 stars
Rolling Stone	4/5 stars

Gary Gerard Hamilton from Associated Press lauded the album as "fearless", "travers[ing] through a spectrum of R&B sonics and vibes, from introspective to seductive, [while] not shying away from any of the pressure that can come with attempting to replicate the success of a song like "ICU." Writing for NME, Puah Ziwei concludes that the album "is deeper, richer and more wide-ranging than anything we’ve ever seen from Jones." Maura Johnston of Rolling Stone praised the album's production, writing: "The album’s sonic touchpoints are varied — Timbaland-inspired electro squelches, Quiet Storm synth blankets, urgent acoustic-guitar arpeggios, swaying Caribbean beats — but Jones’ steady presence brings them all together in a cohesive whole."

== Track listing ==
Why Not More? track listing
No.	Title	Writer(s)	Producer(s)	Length
1.	"Keep It Quiet"	Courtney Jones; Mikkel Eriksen; Jasper Harris; Tor Hermansen; Tom Levesque; Presley Regier	Stargate; Levesque; Regier; Harris	2:35
2.	"Taste"	Jones; Bianca Atterberry; Cathy Dennis; Eriksen; Hermansen; Harris; Henrik Jonback; Christian Karlsson; Aaron Shadrow; Pontus Winnberg	Stargate; Shadrow; Harris	2:44
3.	"On Sight"	Jones; Larrance Dopson; Joelle James; Steve Thornton II	Dopson; Swiff D	4:27
4.	"AEOMG"	Jones; Sara Diamond; Mark Landon; Leven Kali; Luther Vandross; Henry Walter	M-Phazes; Cirkut	2:24
5.	"Thang 4 U"	Jones; Carl Benoit; Cheyenne Lavene; Carl McCormick; Kelvin Wooten	Cardiak; Wu10; Carl Paul; Lavene	3:15
6.	"Here We Go (Uh Oh)"	Jones; Michael Bennett; Diamond; Sydney Floyd; Marisela Jackson; McCormick; Lenny Williams; Wooten	Cardiak; Wu10	3:35
7.	"Other Side of Love"	Jones; Eric Hudson; Midian Mathers; Dan Murdock; Phil Lewis; Sabir Shapiro	Ezzra; Hudson; Lewis; Mathers^{[a]}^{[v]}	2:18
8.	"Why Not More?" (featuring YG Marley)	Jones; Jason Boyd; London Holmes	London on da Track; Protoje; Phil the Keys; Boobie; Poo Bear; Dson^{[a]}; Ziah Push^{[a]}	3:36
9.	"Hit You Where It Hurts"	Jones; Samuel Wishkoski; Zikai	Sam Wish; Happy Perez	2:21
10.	"Most Beautiful Design" (with Future and London on da Track)	Jones; Nija Charles; Almando Cresso; Marcel Korkutata; Holmes; Nayvadius Wilburn	London on da Track; Al Cress; Mars	3:39
11.	"You"	Jones; Micaiah Brown; Philip Cornish; Holmes; Kushaan Khattar; Aubrey Robinson; Demetrius Sims	London on da Track; Phil the Keys; Boobie; Hero; Banger Slanger; 2K	2:52
12.	"Nobody Exists"	Jones	London on da Track; Phil the Keys; Boobie; Ikey	2:43
13.	"By Myself"	Jones; Kirby Dockery; McCormick; Wooten	Cardiak; Wu10	2:54
14.	"Forever Don't Hit Like Before"	Jones; Diamond; Alexander Lewis; Avital Margulies; Kyla Moscovish	Lewis	2:29
Total length:				41:58

Why Not More? digital extended edition bonus tracks
No.	Title	Writer(s)	Producer(s)	Length
15.	"Is It Mine" (featuring Lady London)	Jones; J. Hart; Jaasu Mallory	Jaasu	2:52
16.	"Control Freak"	Jones	Pop Wansel; Rogét Chahayed; Wesley Singerman	2:37
17.	"Taste" (Live from the Terrell Show)	Jones; Atterberry; Dennis; Eriksen; Terrell Grice; Harris; Hermansen; Jonback; Karlsson; Shadrow; Winnberg	Stargate; Shadrow; Harris; Joshua Florez; Cornish; Stargate; Grice	3:53
Total length:				51:21

Why Not More? (More!) digital edition bonus tracks
No.	Title	Writer(s)	Producer(s)	Length
17.	"Here We Go (Uh Oh)" (Remix featuring Leon Thomas)	Courtney Jones; Sydney Floyd; Sara Diamond; Kelvin Wooten; Carl McCormick; Lenny Williams; Michael Bennett; Marisela Jackson	Samuel Cramer Harris	3:37
18.	"Love So Big"	Courtney Jones; Jonathan Hoskins; Michael Orabiyi; Andrew Joseph Gradwohl Jr	Jonathan Hoskins; Scribz Riley; Bigwhite Beatz	2:34
19.	"Passport"	Courtney Jones; Febby Tan; Gabrielle M’Kayla Rodgers	Jeia	2:39
20.	"Delete It"	Courtney Jones; Richard Butler	Camper	3:27
21.	"Other Side of Love" (Remix featuring Alicia Keys)	Alicia Keys; Courtney Jones; Dan “Ezzra” Murdock; Eric Hudson; Phil Lewis; Midian Mathers; Sabir Shapiro; Mike Jackson	Eric Hudson; Phil Lewis; Ezzra	3:13
22.	"Easy"	Courtney Jones; Sara Diamond; Mike Jackson	Johnny Thomas Jr.	3:35

=== Notes ===
- ^{^[c]} signifies a co-producer
- ^{^[a]} signifies an additional producer
- ^{^[v]} signifies a vocal producer
- On all LP editions, "Control Freak" appears in place of "On Sight".
- Additionally, on Target LP editions, a bonus track titled "Hate You Right Now" follows after "Other Side of Love".

Sample credits

- "Taste" interpolates "Toxic", written by Cathy Dennis, Christian Karlsson, Pontus Winnberg, and Henrik Jonback, as performed by Britney Spears.
- "AEOMG" interpolates "Never Too Much", written and performed by Luther Vandross.
- "Here We Go (Uh Oh)" contains a sample of "'Cause I Love You", written by Leonard Williams and Michael Bennett, as performed by Lenny Williams.
- "Is It Mine" interpolates "Angel in Disguise", written by Rodney Jerkins, Fred Jerkins III, LaShawn Daniels, Traci Hale and Nycolia Turman, as performed by Brandy.

== Personnel ==
Credits adapted from Tidal, based on the extended edition track listing.

=== Musicians ===
- Coco Jones – vocals
- Jasper Harris – programming (tracks 1, 2), keyboards (2)
- Presley Regier – programming (track 1)
- Tor Hermansen – programming (tracks 1, 2), bass (2)
- Mikkel Eriksen – programming (tracks 1, 2), drums (2)
- Tom Levesque – programming (track 1)
- Aaron Shadrow – percussion, programming (track 2)
- Cirkut – bass, drums, keyboards (track 4)
- Leven Kali – keyboards (track 4)
- M-Phazes – keyboards (track 4)
- Cardiak – drums, percussion (tracks 5, 6, 13); bass (5)
- Wu10 – bass, keyboards (tracks 5, 6, 13); guitar (6, 13)
- Eric Hudson – bass, guitar, keyboards (track 7)
- Ezzra – drums, keyboards, percussion, programming (track 7)
- Phil Lewis – guitar (track 7)
- Danny Bassie – bass (track 8)
- Lamont "Monty" Savory – guitar (track 8)
- Ziah Push – keyboards, programming (track 8)
- Protoje – programming (track 8)
- Dean Frazer – saxophone (track 8)
- Randy Fletcher – trombone (track 8)
- Okiel McIntyre – trumpet (track 8)
- Samuel Wishkoski – keyboards (track 9)
- Christon Mason – bass (track 11)
- Alexander Lewis – bass, drums, keyboards, percussion, programming (track 14)
- Kyla Moscovich – background vocals (track 14)
- Sara Diamond – background vocals (track 14)
- Jaasu – background vocals, bass, drums, guitar, keyboards, percussion, programming (track 15)
- Nick Clark – bass (track 17)
- Ray Marshall – drums (track 17)
- Glynn Dollison – keyboards (track 17)
- Philip Cornish – keyboards (track 17)

=== Technical ===
- Dave Kutch – mastering (tracks 1–16)
- Jean-Marie Horvat – mixing (tracks 1–16)
- Jasper Harris – engineering (tracks 1, 2)
- Tor Hermansen – engineering (tracks 1, 2)
- Mikkel Eriksen – engineering (tracks 1, 2)
- Presley Regier – engineering (track 1)
- Tom Levesque – engineering (track 1)
- Aaron Shadrow – engineering (track 2)
- Dylan Del-Olmo – engineering (track 3)
- Cirkut – engineering (track 4)
- Frankie Ruggs – engineering (track 5)
- Samuel C. Harris – engineering (track 6)
- Ezzra – engineering (track 7)
- Phil Lewis – engineering (track 7)
- Protoje – engineering (track 8)
- Ziah Push – engineering (track 8)
- Fumiaki Ogata – engineering (track 8)
- Louie Gomez – engineering (tracks 10, 11)
- Tom Kuemerle – engineering (tracks 10, 11)
- Anthony Vega – engineering (track 10)
- Kelvin Wooten – engineering (track 13)
- Alexander Lewis – engineering (track 14)
- Jaasu – engineering (track 15)
- Rafael X. Brown – additional mixing (track 2)

== Charts ==
Chart performance for Why Not More?
Chart (2025)	Peak position
US Billboard 200	59
US Top R&B/Hip-Hop Albums (Billboard)	16
