= N3wyrkla =

- Born: Nyla Naalin Nasir; April 2, 2002 (age 24); Pennsauken Township, New Jersey, U.S.
- Genres: R&B; alternative R&B
- Occupations: Singer; songwriter; rapper
- Years active: 2023–present
- Labels: Venice; COLTURE

Nyla Naalin Nasir (born April 2, 2002), known professionally as N3wyrkla (pronounced New York LA), is an American singer-songwriter and rapper. Nasir rose to prominence with her guest performance alongside ASAP Rocky on Brent Faiyaz's 2023 song "Outside All Night" for his debut mixtape Larger than Life. The song peaked at number 1 on the Billboard Bubbling Under Hot 100, and received a gold certification by the Recording Industry Association of America (RIAA). Earlier that year, she released her debut extended play (EP), Selfishly Entitled (2023).

In 2023, she embarked on her musical career. Partnering with Colture, Venice Music, and her father’s Million Dollaz Worth of Game Entertainment imprint and releasing her debut extended play (EP), Selfishy Entitled. She would release It's Not You, It's Me (2024). Later co-headlining an American tour with ASAP Ferg the following year.

== Early life ==
Nyla Naalin Nasir was born on April 2, 2002 in Pennsauken Township, New Jersey. Her father is of African-American descent. In an interview with BET, Nasir stated “I grew up [like] in choirs. I played like instruments a little bit, but I feel like going to college and just going through life made me realize like, Okay, I have some confidence to do music”. Also explaining that “I just started locking it in the studio every day, trying to perfect my sound and really dive into what I want to tell through my art.” In her interview with Viper, she mentioned that "Before I was making music I was going to college for pre-law. After making some wrong decisions and failing my first year, it was a wakeup call for me to figure out what I really was passionate about."

== Career ==
Nasir released her debut single "Care About Myself" on August 11, 2023. In August 2023, after partnering with Colture, Venice Music, and Gillie da Kid's Million Dollaz Worth of Game Entertainment imprint, she released her debut extended play (EP) SELFishly enTITLED. On October 27, 2023, Nasir was featured in Brent Faiyaz's "Outside All Night," which featured ASAP Rocky. Nasir would start recording music in 2023. Nasir released her first EP Selfishly Entitled. Later she would release her second EP titled, It's Not You, It's Me (2024). Later that year, she would collaborate with American record producer Timbaland on "Ch3rry".

== Artistry ==
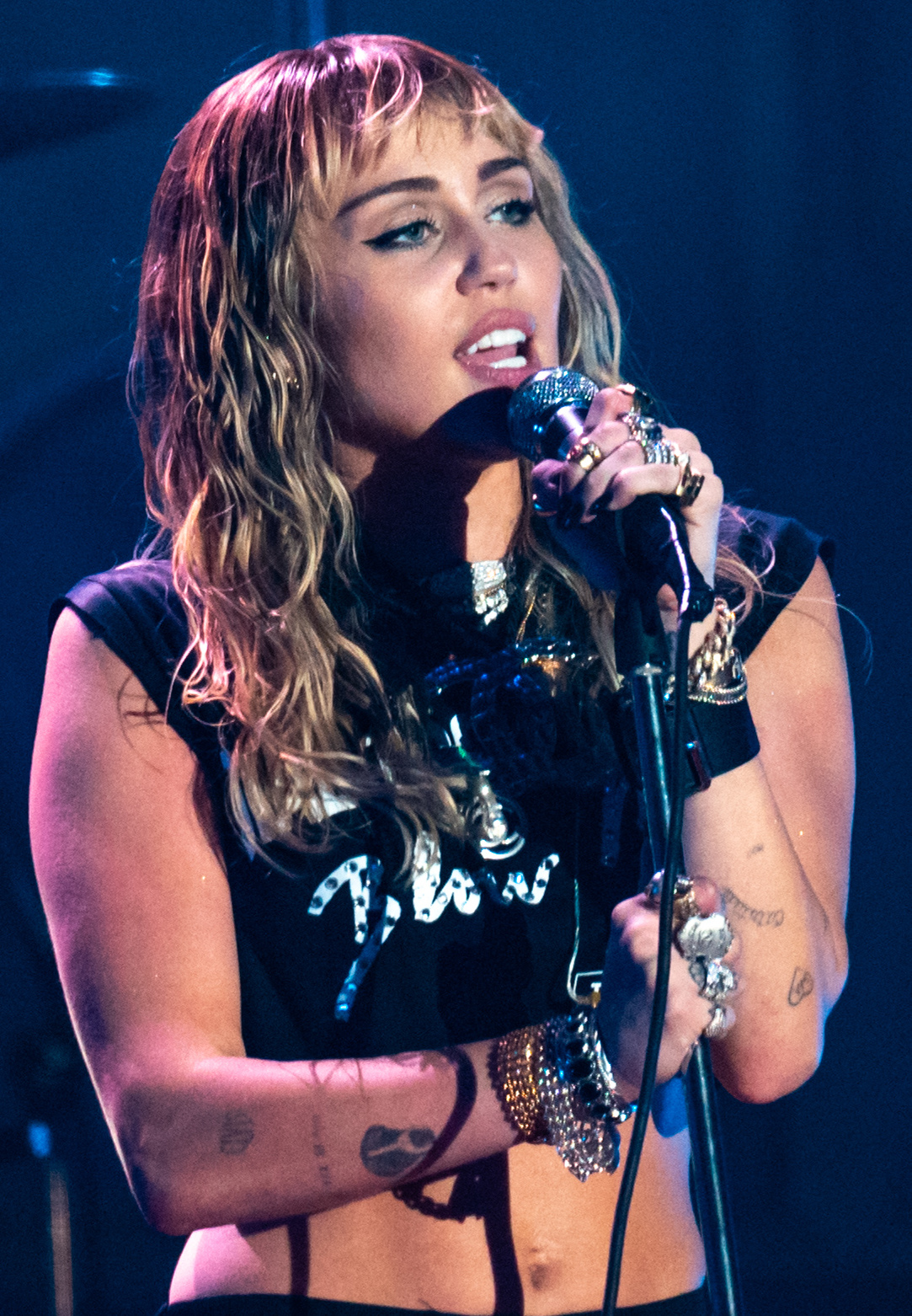
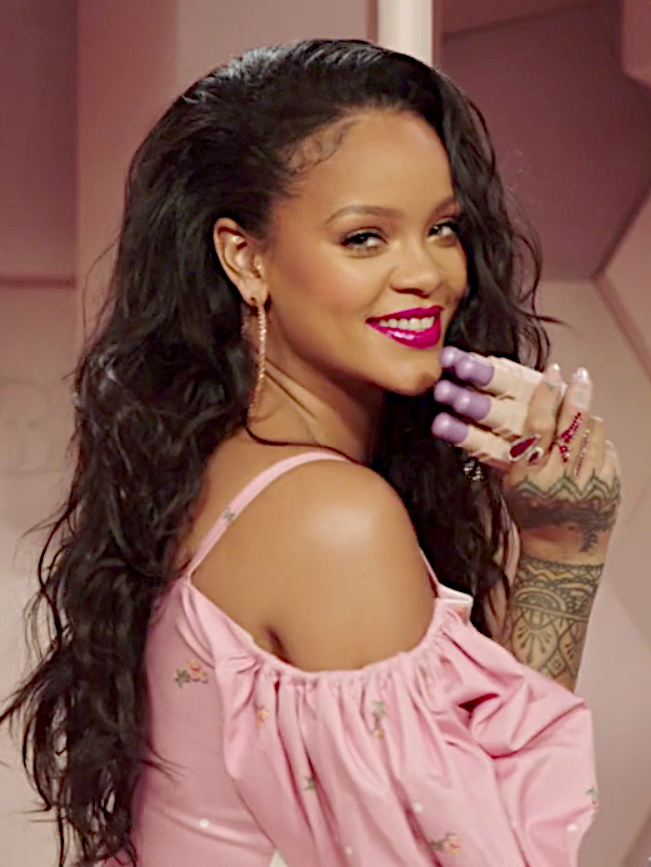
N3wyrkla was inspired by a variety of artists including Miley Cyrus (left) and Rihanna (right).

=== Influences ===
Nasir has referred to Miley Cyrus, Lady Gaga, and Rihanna as her biggest influence. She cited these artists for their "confidence", "originality", and "unique" vocal tones. When speaking to The Philadelphia Inquirer, Nasir stated; "I was the biggest Hannah Montana and Miley fan, especially when she dropped her album Bangerz". She also cited Lil Uzi Vert, M.K. gee, Teezo Touchdown, and TiaCorine as some of her inspirations.

=== Musical style ===
Paul Meara writing for BET felt that her genre was neo-soul, indie, and R&B. While HotNewHipHop's Zachary Horvath said she blends pop rap, R&B, and alternative music. N3wyrkla is often for her "raw" storytelling and "captivating" sound. Amber Corrine at VIBE wrote that she was an alternative neo-soul and alt-rock star. Notion's Darcy Culverhouse described her extended play (EP) It's Not You, It's Me (2024) as a switch between R&B and alternative, further explaining that it was an evolution of her sound. Zangba Thomson writing for Bong Mines Entertainment wrote "the multi-faceted artist continues to demonstrate her innate ability in bridging the gap between Pop, Rock, and experimental R&B."
