= Full moon (disambiguation) =

Full moon is a lunar phase.

Full Moon may also refer to:

== Literature ==
- Full Moon (novel), 1947 novel by P. G. Wodehouse
- Full Moon o Sagashite or Full Moon, manga
- Full Moon, play by Emlyn Williams
- Full Moon, play by Reynolds Price 1994
- Full Moon, short story by Jia Pingwa, 1977
- Full Moon, short story by Georgette Heyer
- Full Moon, second book in the Dark Guardian series
- Full Moon, biography of Keith Moon written by Dougal Butler

== Film and TV ==
- Full Moon (1937 film), Terang Boelan, a 1937 film from the Dutch East Indies
- Full Moon (1960 film) Chaudhvin Ka Chand, 1960 Urdu-language Indian film
- Full Moon (1988 film) (German: Vollmond), Swiss art film
- Full Moon (2017 film), (German: Vollmond), German film with Oliver Stokowski
- "Full Moon" (Homicide: Life on the Street), a 1996 television episode
- Dolunay (TV series) (international title: Full Moon), Turkish TV series with Özge Gürel and Can Yaman
- Full Moon Features, an American film company

== Music ==
=== Albums ===
- Full Moon (Brandy album) or the title song (see below), 2002
- Full Moon (Charlie Daniels album), 1980
- Full Moon (Kris Kristofferson and Rita Coolidge album), 1973
- Full Moon (Paul Brady album), 1986
- Full Moon, by Hiroomi Tosaka, 2018
- Full Moon, by Valery Leontiev, 1993

=== EPs ===
- Full Moon (EXID EP), 2017
- Full Moon (Sunmi EP) or the title song (see below), 2014
- Full Moon, by Yxng Bane, 2016

=== Songs ===
- "Full Moon" (Armand Van Helden song), 2000
- "Full Moon" (Benny Goodman song), English-language version of "Noche de luna", 1942
- "Full Moon" (Brandy song), 2002
- "Full Moon" (Sunmi song), 2014
- "Full Moon (Fall in Tokyo)", by Brent Faiyaz, 2025
- "Full Moon", by the Black Ghosts, 2008
- "Full Moon", by Cult of Luna from The Long Road North, 2022
- "Full Moon", by Dreamcatcher, 2018
- "Full Moon", by Heavenly from Carpe Diem, 2009
- "Full Moon", by the Kinks from Sleepwalker, 1977
- "Full Moon", by Rage from Speak of the Dead, 2006
- "Full Moon", by Santana from Spirits Dancing in the Flesh, 1990
- "FullMoon", by Sonata Arctica from Ecliptica, 1999
- "Full Moon", by Stratovarius from Dreamspace (bonus track), 1994

=== Record labels ===
- Full Moon Productions, an American label, 1991–2012
- Full Moon Records, an American label, 1974–1992

== Other uses ==
- Full Moon Party in Thailand

== See also ==
- Full Moon Fever (disambiguation)
- Fool Moon (disambiguation)
