= Peter Pan (Brent Faiyaz song) =

Single by Brent Faiyaz
- Released: July 4, 2025
- Genre: R&B
- Length: 3:04
- Label: ISO Supremacy; UnitedMasters
- Songwriter: Christopher Wood
- Producers: Beat Butcha; Ben Lusher; Coop The Truth; Nascent; Matt Hines; Bus the Producer; Bazelais Jr.; MikeBlud

Brent Faiyaz singles chronology
"For Me (Remix)" (2024)	"Peter Pan" (2025)	"Tony Soprano" (2025)

"Peter Pan" (stylized in all lowercase "peter pan.") is a song by American R&B singer Brent Faiyaz. It was released on July 4, 2025, through ISO Supremacy and UnitedMasters alongside "Tony Soprano" as promotion for his third studio album, Icon (2026). It is an R&B song driven by piano, incorporating elements of DMV rap into its mix. The song is named after the main character of the play and novel Peter Pan. "Peter Pan" was written by Faiyaz, while production was handled by multiple record producers. It would peak at number 25 on the New Zealand Hot Singles chart.

== Background and composition ==
Prior to the release of "Peter Pan", American R&B singer Brent Faiyaz announced his new partnership with UnitedMasters and released his debut mixtape, Larger Than Life (2023). Faiyaz would go on hiatus, later making a guest appearance on American rapper Loe Shimmy's November 2024 remix of "For Me". On July 3, 2025, Faiyaz would clear his Instagram page, suggesting that he was preparing for an album, before posting a picture of what was interpreted as a promotional cover for the album. On July 4, Faiyaz would drop the singles, "Tony Soprano" and "Peter Pan", immediately after the album's announcement. In an interview with Rolling Stone, Faiyaz stated that with the two-pack, he's "embracing duality" with "Peter Pan" being "outside of all that, free from limits" and is "full of wonder".

== Critical reception ==
Upon its release, "Peter Pan" was met with generally positive reviews from music critics. HotNewHipHop's Paul Bryson felt the song "channels Faiyaz’s softer side". While Marvin Twiggs writing for Earmilk wrote described the track as "mellow, washed soul-jazz loop—distant piano, some faint choral background—just enough rhythm to feel to drive the track without interrupting the singing to-yourself-in-the-dark vibe."

== Charts ==
=== Weekly charts ===
Chart performance for "Peter Pan"
Chart (2025)	Peak position
New Zealand Hot Singles (RMNZ)	25
US Hot R&B/Hip-Hop Songs (Billboard)	47
