= Best Time =

Best Time may refer to:

- Best Time (TV series), a 2013 Chinese television series
- "Best Time" (BGYO song), 2022
- "Best Time" (Brent Faiyaz song), 2023
