= Fool Moon =

Fool Moon may refer to:

- Fool Moon (The Dresden Files), a 2001 novel by Jim Butcher
- Fool Moon (film), a 2016 French film
- Fool Moon (play), a 1993 play by Bill Irwin and David Shiner
- Fool Moon (band), a Hungarian a cappella group
- Fool Moon, a 1989 album by Amon Düül UK
- Fool Moon, a 2008 album by Anslom Nakikus
- "Fool Moon", a song by Anteros from the 2020 film Eurovision Song Contest: The Story of Fire Saga

== See also ==
- Full moon (disambiguation)
