= WY@ =

2023 single by Brent Faiyaz

Single by Brent Faiyaz

from the album Larger than Life
- Released: September 19, 2023
- Genre: R&B
- Length: 3:27
- Label: ISO Supremacy; UnitedMasters
- Songwriters: Christopher Wood; David Patino; Bailey Goldberg; Anthoine Walters; Othello Houston; Jonathan Wells
- Producers: Dpat; Berg; Walters; Otxhello; Wells

Brent Faiyaz singles chronology
"Moment of Your Life" (2023)	"WY@" (2023)	"Piece of My Heart" (2024)

Music video
- "WY@" on YouTube

"WY@" (abbreviation for "Where You At") is a song by American singer Brent Faiyaz. It was released on September 19, 2023 through ISO Supremacy and UnitedMasters, as the second single from his debut mixtape, Larger than Life (2023). It was produced by Dpat, Berg, Anthoine Walters, Otxhello and Jonathan Wells. "WY@" would peak at number thirty-nine on the US Billboard Hot R&B/Hip-Hop Songs chart and receive a platinum certification from the Recording Industry Association of America (RIAA). A music video directed by Mark Peaced featuring Mexican-Kenyan actor Lupita Nyong'o premiered in February 2024, depicting Faiyaz driving into the woods. It was written by Faiyaz, Chrome Sparks, and Marshmello.

== Background and recording ==
In an interview with Rolling Stone, Faiyaz would state: “I’m a procrastinator, I’m a frivolous spender, and I definitely spend a lot of time with a lot of different women. That record reflects having access and opportunity, and having to say no to certain s–t or the inability to say no to certain s–t.” Going further into detail, "That record is about addiction in a way, shape, or form, but more from the perspective of submitting to it versus fighting against it. It touches on addiction in a way that makes it a little more seductive. That’s on some, ‘Where you at?’ That late-night text you send, you probably been drinking a little bit, been outside, know you shouldn’t do that sh*t — but f**k it. The access is always gonna be there, so I’m gonna pull up."

== Production and composition ==
Faiyaz wrote "WY@" alongside its producers and engineers, Dpat, Berg, Anthoine Walters, Otxhello and Jonathan Wells. The song revolves around him being in a relationship that he knows is toxic, but he is unwilling to leave his partner, because he enjoys the thrills of their sexual activity. "WY@" includes vocals from a Latina singer who delivers sexually charged lyrics ("I'm waiting for you with my legs open and my heart open / I can still taste you in my mouth / No one can make me shake like you"). The song's lyrics are centered around trust issues.

== Critical reception ==
Robin Murray writing for Clash wrote the song was "a barbed piece of emotive R&B, a song about love, devotion, and the pain of parting."

== Music video ==
Faiyaz teased the music video for "WY@" in January 2024. Mark Peaced would direct the music video for "WY@", which premiered on February 14, 2024.

== Live performances ==
Faiyaz would perform the song at his Eventim Apollo concert in London. Later it would be streamed as an Apple Music exclusive on November 29, 2023. In a press release, he said: “We had a time on the road. Thank you Apple Music for allowing me to bring the F–k the World It’s a Wasteland Tour experience to millions. Hope you enjoy the show.”

== Charts ==
=== Weekly charts ===
Weekly chart performance for "WY@"
Chart (2023)	Peak position
New Zealand Hot Singles (RMNZ)	33
US Bubbling Under Hot 100 (Billboard)	11
US Hot R&B/Hip-Hop Songs (Billboard)	39

== Certifications and sales ==
Region	Certification	Certified units/sales
United States (RIAA)	Platinum	1,000,000^{‡}
^{‡} Sales+streaming figures based on certification alone.
