= Major Figgas =

American hip hop group

- Origin: Philadelphia, Pennsylvania, U.S.
- Genres: Hip hop
- Years active: 1999–2003
- Labels: RuffNation; Warner Bros.
- Past members: Gillie da Kid; Bump J Dutch; Spade-O; Bianca; Ressy Rolx; Ab-Liva; Wallo; Chops (deceased); Lil' Rucie (deceased); El Dinero; P-Nut; Dirty Rik (deceased)

Major Figgas was an American hip hop group from Philadelphia, Pennsylvania.

== History ==
Major Figgas was founded in the Erie Ave area of Philadelphia by Gillie da Kid, Wallo, and Ab-Liva, who were friends from the neighborhood. They knew Bump J, Dutch and Ressy Rolx from all living in the same area, and eventually expanded after inducting Spade and Bianca. Chops, Rucie, El Dinero and Dirty Rik all soon came aboard.

After releasing several underground tapes, they released the full-length Figgas 4 Life independently which landed them a deal with RuffNation Records and Warner Bros. Records. Founding member Wallo could not participate in the album as he was sentenced to a 20-year prison sentence prior to the recording (Wallo was released in 2017). An expanded edition of the album was issued in 2000, which reached number 115 on the U.S.Billboard 200 and number 29 on the R&B/Hip-Hop Albums chart. Their lone major radio hit was "Yeah That's Us", which reached number 2 on the Rap Singles chart and number 34 on the R&B Singles chart.

Sometime after the release of their single "Yeah That's Us" and their only album, they left RuffNation. In the progress of working on their next project, member Spade-O was jailed in 2002/2003 for the murder of the cousin of Young Chris, member of the duo Young Gunz and a part of State Property, who was embroiled in a beef with Major Figgas. Soon after, they disbanded.

After the dissolution of Major Figgas, Gillie Da Kid and his cousin Wallo created the Million Dollaz Worth of Game podcast.

== Discography ==
Year	Album	Chart Positions	
Year	Album	US	US Hip-Hop
2000	Figgas 4 Life	115	29
