= Figgas 4 Life =

Studio album by Major Figgas
- Released: June 30, 2000
- Recorded: 1999–2000
- Genre: Gangsta rap
- Length: 1:26:31
- Label: RuffNation; Warner Bros.
- Producer: Cedric "Smitty" Smith; Darnell Marshall; Dean Murder; Hot Runner; Lee Johnson; Leon Kidd; Melvin Carter

Singles from Figgas 4 Life
- 1. "Yeah That's Us" Released: September 25, 2000

Figgas 4 Life is the only studio album by American hip hop group Major Figgas. It was released on June 30, 2000, through RuffNation Records. The album was produced by HotRunner, Darnell Marshall, Dean Murder, Lee Johnson, Leon Kidd, Melvin Carter, and Cedric "Smitty" Smith. It features a guest appearance from Kenny Whitehead. The album peaked at number 115 on the Billboard 200, number 29 on the Top R&B/Hip-Hop Albums and number 3 on the Top Heatseekers. Its lead single "Yeah That's Us" made it to number thirty on the Hot R&B/Hip-Hop Songs and number two on the Hot Rap Songs.

== Critical reception ==
Professional ratings
Review scores
Source	Rating
AllMusic	3/5 stars
Los Angeles Times	2.5/4 stars
RapReviews	5/10
USA Today	2.5/4 stars

The Morning Call called the album "a fairly ho-hum affair from these Philly natives, only punctuated by some sterling production that is never matched by either passion or innovation on the lyrical bent".

AllMusic wrote: "With at least seven rappers working in various combinations, the group varies its sound effectively. Unfortunately, beyond musical interest, there is little but the usual nomenclature of gangsta rap to be found in the actual words".

== Track listing ==
No.	Title	Writer(s)	Producer(s)	Length
1.	"Intro"	M. Woods		1:08
2.	"Ya'll Can't Fuck wit da Figgas"	Far'd Nasir; Rennard East; Asa Deshawn Burbage; Antonio Walker; Michael Allen; Bianca Jones; M. Brown	Hotrunner	6:19
3.	"Is It My Style?"	Nasir; East; Burbage; Walker; T. Tailor	Leon Kidd; Brian Bricklin (add.); Ian Cross (add.)	4:41
4.	"The Crack"	Nasir; Burbage	Lee Johnson; Brian Bricklin (add.); Ian Cross (add.)	4:01
5.	"It's Our Life"	East; Burbage; Walker; M. Allen; Jones	Hotrunner	4:37
6.	"What U Hatin' For?"	East; Walker; Tailor; L. Smith	Darnell Marshall	3:51
7.	"Smooth Thug" (Remix)	East; T. Wooden	Dean Murder	4:09
8.	"Don't Let a Nigga Stress U Girl"	Nasir; Jones	Dean Murder	3:26
9.	"Yeah That's Us"	Nasir; East; Burbage; M. Allen; Jones	Hotrunner	4:21
10.	"I Love Being a Gangsta"	Nasir; Burbage; Walker	Melvin "Ruggedness" Carter	5:37
11.	"Things in the Clubs"	Nasir; East; Burbage; M. Allen; Brown	Dean Murder	4:36
12.	"You Didn't Feel Me Then" (featuring Kenny Whitehead)	Nasir; Burbage; Walker; M. Allen	Darnell Marshall	5:13
13.	"What U Know 'bout Ballin'?"	Nasir; East; Walker; M. Allen	Dean Murder	3:29
14.	"It Ain't Shit 2 Us"	East; Brown; Tailor; Wooden; S. Allen	Darnell Marshall	4:59
15.	"Reese "Fuckin'" Rolx"	Brown		3:34
16.	"Yeah That's Us" (Remix)	Nasir; East; Burbage; M. Allen; Jones	Hotrunner; Cedric "Smitty" Smith	4:45
17.	Untitled			17:45
Total length:				1:26:31

== Personnel ==
- Far'd "Gillie Da Kid" Nasir – songwriter (tracks: 2–4, 8–13, 16), executive producer
- Rennard "AB Liva" East – songwriter (tracks: 2, 3, 5–7, 9, 11, 13, 14, 16)
- Asa "Spade" Burbage – songwriter (tracks: 2–5, 9–12, 16)
- Antonio "Dutch" Walker – songwriter (tracks: 2, 3, 5, 6, 10, 12, 13)
- Michael Allen – songwriter (tracks: 2, 5, 9, 11–13, 16)
- Bianca Jones ("Bianca") – songwriter (tracks: 2, 5, 8, 9, 16)
- M. Brown – songwriter (tracks: 2, 11, 14, 15)
- T. Tailor ("Dirty Rik") – songwriter (tracks: 3, 6, 14)
- T. Wooden ("Lil Rucie") – songwriter (tracks: 7, 14)
- M. Woods – songwriter (track 1)
- L. Smith – songwriter (track 6)
- S. Allen – songwriter (track 14)
- Kenny Whitehead – guest performer (track 12)
- Terrance "HotRunner" Lovelace – producer (tracks: 2, 5, 9, 16), mixing (track 16)
- Leon Kidd – producer (track 3)
- Lee Johnson – producer (track 4)
- Darnell Marshall – producer (tracks: 6, 12, 14)
- Dean Murder – producer (tracks: 7, 8, 11, 13)
- Melvin "Ruggedness" Carter – producer (track 10)
- Cedric "Smitty" Smith – producer (track 16)
- Brian Bricklin – additional producer (tracks: 3, 4)
- Ian Cross – additional producer (tracks: 3, 4), recording (tracks: 2, 4, 9), mixing (tracks: 2, 3, 9), engineering (track 16)
- Warren Riker – mixing (tracks: 4, 16)
- Christof – engineering assistant (track 9)
- Chris Schwartz – executive producer
- Marcus Graham – executive producer
- Etre Creative Services – design

== Charts ==
Chart (2000)	Peak position
US Billboard 200	115
US Top R&B/Hip-Hop Albums (Billboard)	29
US Heatseekers Albums (Billboard)	3
