= Kevon Glickman =

Kevon Glickman (born November 5, 1960) is an American music producer and entertainment lawyer. Previously, Glickman was President and CEO of RuffNation Records, a joint venture with Warner Bros. Records. Glickman, has previously, and currently represents well known music, entertainment, and sports figures in legal matters and disputes including Jay-Z, former Wu-Tang Clan producer Selwyn Bougard, the widow of Teddy Pendergrass, and Kevin Pendergast.

Admitted to practice in PA, NJ, and NY since 1989, Kevon’s career path includes stints at leading law firms and media companies. Kevon’ s law firm experience, prior to forming Kevon Glickman Law and Blingnot Media LLC, was as a principal at Offit Kurman, a fast growing firm of 100 lawyers in Virginia, Washington, Baltimore, Wilmington and Philadelphia, Special Counsel to Bochetto& Lentz, a trial lawyer’s firm in Center City Philadelphia, Sr Attorney at Jacobs Law Group, a Philadelphia firm specializing in business divorce, and assistant General Counsel for Metropolitan Broadcasting Corporation in NYC.

Kevon has representing Grammy award winners and top tier recording artists including Teddy Pendergrass Estate, The Delfonics, The Supremes, Lauryn Hill, The Fugees, Wyclef Jean, Funkmaster Flex, Rick Ross, Flo Rida, Trina, D’Angelo, Cypress Hill, Leela James and countless others.

Kevon is presently CEO of Blingnot Media, a talent management firm and digital music distributor. Previously Kevon was President of Invincible Pictures, a film production and distribution company that launched FlixFling, a mobile phone application for downloading film to cell phones. Kevon has also held positions as President of Respect Management which signed Rick Ross and Flo Rida, President/COO of Ruffnation/Rufflife/Ruffsongs a joint venture with Warner Music Group, and Executive Vice-President of Ruffhouse Records, a joint venture with Sony Entertainment and responsible for the largest selling rap album of all time, “The Score” by The Fugees which won two Grammy Awards and “The Miseducation of Lauryn Hill”, which won five Grammy Awards.

Since 1990, Kevon has been a partner in radio station WDST, Radio Woodstock Network. Radio Woodstock is the co-promoter of Mountain Jam a 4 day outdoor festival at Hunter Mountain NY now in its 9th year. Radio Woodstock also releases compilation of rare live recordings and 100% of the proceeds support of the Dyson Cancer Center in Poughkeepsie NY.

Kevon has also been an adjunct professor at Drexel University and Cabrini College and is a frequent lecturer at Temple, Widener, and Drexel. Kevon received a B.A. in Psychology at Emory University, and a J.D. from the John Marshall Law School in Chicago with a semester studying International Tax Law at Kings College in London.
