= Terrell Grice =

American producer and YouTuber

- Born: Mullins, South Carolina, U.S.
- Occupations: YouTuber; producer; singer-songwriter

Instagram information
- Page: terrellgrice

YouTube information
- Channel: TERRELL
- Years active: 2018–present
- Genres: Comedy; talk show; music; game show
- Subscribers: 1.37 million
- Views: 201 million
- Last updated: March 19, 2025
- Website: theterrellshow.com

Terrell Antonio Grice (born September 21, 1993) is an American producer, host, singer-songwriter, and YouTuber. He is best known as the host of the variety talk show The Terrell Show, where he has interviewed guests including Keke Palmer, Chloe Bailey, The Clark Sisters, Tia Mowry, Michelle Williams, Cynthia Erivo, Kelly Clarkson and Coco Jones. His channel has approximately 1.43 million subscribers as of October 2026. Grice has been twice nominated for the NAACP Image Award for Social Media Personality of the Year.

== Early life and education ==
Grice was born and raised in the small town of Mullins, South Carolina. He moved to North Carolina with his mother when he was 14. Grice was raised a devout Christian and attended church regularly, where he also sang in the choir. He was not allowed to listen to secular music and grew up listening to gospel artists like Helen Baylor, Shirley Caesar, and the Winans. Grice began listening to R&B music during high school when a friend played him Brandy's Have You Ever?.

A serious player from age 11, he played tennis competitively. He had an undefeated record until a shoulder injury forced him to step away from the sport. After having to quit tennis, Grice took a class about television that developed his interest in the entertainment industry. He went on to receive his bachelor's degree in film making from Full Sail University.

== Career ==
Grice moved to Los Angeles after college and worked in television production as a casting producer for programs including Big Brother and Showtime at the Apollo. He credits the experience with teaching him skills in interviewing.

In January 2018, Grice started a YouTube channel with reaction videos to television singing competitions The Voice and The Four. As his following grew, he began using his one-bedroom apartment to interview guests for a web series that he named The Terrell Show. The guests are singers, producers, and actors, many who are up-and-coming, and the interviews usually feature a game called Song Association. The Source referred to the show as "one of the most comprehensive talent discovery platforms for R&B music." Previous guests include Amber Riley, Durand Bernarr, Cynthia Erivo, Avery Wilson, Lalah Hathaway, The Clark Sisters, PJ Morton, and Todrick Hall. Ivan Guzman of Paper described the series: "With Grice as the show's warm and energetic steward, viewers get a glimpse into the candid humanness of big time celebrities'...personal lives and careers." Grice's channel also includes the original singing competition Race to the Blue, which debuted in 2019.

Grice is a singer-songwriter and in 2020 independently released the album An Invitation to the Cookout featuring vocal performances from several past Terrell Show guests.

He was named to the #YouTubeBlackVoices Creator Class of 2021, and used the funding to move his productions to a professional studio. That year he also launched the cooking series T and Coco with singer and actress Coco Jones.

Grice was a red carpet host for the 62nd Grammy Awards and was also hired as an official host of the 93rd Oscars Virtual Watch Party.

Grice signed with the talent agency CAA in November 2022. He performed in his first professional acting role on season three of The Ms. Pat Show in 2023. Season 6 of The Terrell Show debuted in 2023, and included guests Kelly Clarkson, Tia Mowry, Keke Palmer, Michelle Williams, Kelly Rowland and Samara Joy. In March 2025, Grice debuted the TERRELL Show Concert series with a performance by Coco Jones.

== Discography ==
- An Invitation To The Cookout (2020)
- The TERRELL One Million Show (2021)
- THE PHENOMENON (2026)

== Personal life ==
Grice is gay, and a Christian.

== Awards and nominations ==
- 2022 – Nominee, NAACP Image Awards, Social Media Personality of the Year
- 2022 – AT&T Dream in Black Future Maker
- 2023 – The Root 100, Honoree
- 2024 – Nominee, NAACP Image Awards, Social Media Personality of the Year
