= Best Time (Brent Faiyaz song) =

Song by Brent Faiyaz

from the album Larger than Life
- Released: October 27, 2023
- Genre: R&B
- Length: 1:22
- Label: ISO Supremacy; UnitedMasters
- Songwriters: Christopher Wood; David Patino; Kelis Rogers; Thomas Richman
- Producer: Dpat

Music video
- "Best Time" on YouTube

"Best Time" is a song by American singer-songwriter and rapper Brent Faiyaz. It was released through ISO Supremacy and UnitedMasters as the fourth track off his debut mixtape Larger than Life, on October 27, 2023. The song was written by Faiyaz, alongside David Patino, Kelis Rogers and Tommy Richman. "Best Time" had peaked at number sixteen on the US Billboard Hot R&B Songs chart and received a Platinum certification from the Recording Industry Association of America (RIAA).

== Background and composition ==
"Best Time" was co-written by American singer and rapper Tommy Richman with production handled by Dpat. The music video for the song was directed by Lonewolf and depicts Faiyaz traveling the world. "Best Time" is 1 minute and 22 seconds long. It is a bass-driven R&B and soul song that incorporates elements of hip-hop.

== Critical reception ==
Pitchfork's Alphonse Pierre had compared the song to the likes of American record production duo The Neptunes. While Starr Bowenbank writing for Billboard felt the song had a "woozy" beat. Shorayi Mauluka of New Wave Magazine would write that the song's production was reminiscent of Pharrell Williams' in the 2000s. While The Source's Shawn Grant would comment of the song's "infectious" beats.

== Commercial performance ==
The song would peak at number sixteen on the US Billboard Hot R&B Songs chart. Later received a Platinum certification from the Recording Industry Association of America (RIAA), and the British Phonographic Industry (BPI). Meanwhile on the US Bubbling Under Hot 100, the song would peak at number 13.

== Personnel ==
- Brent Faiyaz – vocals, production, songwriting
- Thomas Richman – vocals, songwriting, production
- Kelis Rogers – songwriting
- Dpat – songwriting, production

== Charts ==
Weekly chart performance for "Best Time"
| Chart (2023) | Peak position |
|---|---|
| US Bubbling Under Hot 100 (Billboard) | 13 |
| US Hot R&B/Hip-Hop Songs (Billboard) | 41 |
| US Hot R&B Songs (Billboard) | 16 |
| UK Singles (Official Charts) | 89 |
| New Zealand Hot Singles (RMNZ) | 10 |

== Certifications and sales ==
Certifications and sales for Best Time
| Region | Certification | Certified units/sales |
|---|---|---|
| Denmark (IFPI Danmark) | Gold | 45,000^{‡} |
| New Zealand (RMNZ) | Platinum | 30,000^{‡} |
| United Kingdom (BPI) | Silver | 200,000^{‡} |
| United States (RIAA) | Platinum | 1,000,000^{‡} |
^{‡} Sales+streaming figures based on certification alone.
