= Full Moon Fever (disambiguation) =

Full Moon Fever is an album by Tom Petty.

Full Moon Fever may also refer to:

- Full Moon Fever (comics), a graphic novel by Joe Casey
- Full Moon Fever (novella), a Goosebumps book by R.L. Stine

== See also ==
- Full Moon (disambiguation)
