= What I Didn't Tell You =

EP by Coco Jones
- Released: November 4, 2022
- Genre: R&B
- Length: 20:19
- Label: High Standardz; Def Jam
- Producer: AmoBeatz; Babyface; BongobytheWay; BPM 120 West Productions; DJ Camper; Elliott; Eric Hudson; Fortune; Fridayy; Golden; Jaasu; Jonnywood; London on da Track; Mike Molina; Needlz; Nelson Bridges; Phil the Keys; Prep Bijan; Steven Shaeffer; The Collective

Coco Jones chronology
| H.D.W.Y (2019) | What I Didn't Tell You (2022) | Coco by the Fireplace (2024) |

Singles from What I Didn't Tell You
- 1. "Caliber" Released: March 25, 2022; 2. "ICU" Released: October 21, 2022; 3. "Double Back" Released: May 4, 2023

What I Didn't Tell You is the fifth extended play by American singer and actress Coco Jones. It was released on November 4, 2022, by High Standardz and Def Jam Recordings, marking Jones' second major label release since 2013's Made Of (which was released through Hollywood Records). The EP features the singles "Caliber" and "ICU", the latter of which was her first entry on the US Billboard Hot 100, and won the award for Best R&B Performance at the 66th Annual Grammy Awards.

A deluxe edition of the EP was released on January 20, 2023, featuring 4 bonus tracks, including the previously released Babyface collaboration "Simple". This reissue was also nominated at the 66th Annual Grammy Awards for Best R&B Album.

== Background ==
In June 2012, Coco Jones played the lead role of Roxie in the Disney Channel television movie, Let It Shine. Starring alongside Tyler James Williams and Trevor Jackson, the movie was the most watched Disney Channel Original Movie and most watched movie of the year for kids and tweens in 2012. Jones and the other main cast of Let It Shine performed at the 43rd Annual NAACP Image Awards Nominees Luncheon prior to the movie's release. Around the same time, Jones also signed a record deal with Hollywood Records and released her debut single, "Holla at the DJ" at the end of the year in December 2012. Her extended play Made Of was released on March 12, 2013, and she toured with Mindless Behavior later that year. Jones performed with Mindless Behavior at Radio Disney's Radio Disney Music Awards, and took home an award for "Funniest Celebrity Take." Following the release of the EP, Jones worked in the studio with David Banner, Ester Dean and Jukebox, planning to release her debut album by August 2013.

After leaving Hollywood Records and Disney in early 2014, Jones released multiple singles and EPs as an independent artist between 2014 and 2020, including the EPs Let Me Check It and H.D.W.Y. Jones would also release a new YouTube video in September 2020, in which she talked about her negative experiences in the industry, dealing with colorism. According to her, executives decided she was not marketable enough after featuring in Let It Shine.

The next year, in November 2021, Jones was cast in Peacock's The Fresh Prince of Bel-Air reimagining Bel-Air, portraying Hilary Banks. The show would eventually premiere in February 2022, and around the time its first season was airing, it was announced that Jones had signed a new artist deal with High Standardz and Def Jam Recordings.

== Track listing ==
What I Didn't Tell You track listing
| No. | Title | Writer(s) | Producer(s) | Length |
|---|---|---|---|---|
| 1. | "Crazy for Me" | Courtney Jones; Jaasu Mallory; Johannes Barker; Sebastian Kole | Jaasu; Jonnywood | 2:14 |
| 2. | "Caliber" | Jones; Eric Hudson; Uforo Ebong; Edwin Serrano; Roy Keisha Rockette | Hudson; BongoByTheWay | 3:02 |
| 3. | "Double Back" | Jones; London Holmes; Philip Cornish; Michael Molina; Cam Griffin; Daniel Elias Guerrero Ramos; Demi Hairston; Brian Alexander Morgan; Jaco Pastorius | London on da Track; Phil the Keys; Molina; Golden | 2:39 |
| 4. | "ICU" | Jones; Darhyl Camper; Raymond Komba; Rockette; Trav Simmons | DJ Camper | 4:01 |
| 5. | "No Chaser" | Jones; Camper; Al Sherrod Lambert; Allyson Watkins; Sage White | DJ Camper | 2:53 |
| 6. | "Headline" | Jones; Nelson Bridges; Jitotwe Tsombela; Benjii Yang; Brandon Hesson; Rockette; Theresa Jones; Troshia Keeton; Vurdell Muller | Bridges; AmoBeatz | 2:50 |
| 7. | "Spend It" | Jones; Khari Cain; Kenneth Edmonds; Milton Adams II; Brandon Hesson; Dominic Gordon; James Foye; Mayila Jones; Sheldon Grant | Needlz | 2:36 |
| Total length: | | | | 20:19 |

Deluxe edition (bonus tracks)
| No. | Title | Writer(s) | Producer(s) | Length |
|---|---|---|---|---|
| 8. | "Fallin" | Jones; Jean-Marie Horvat; Justin Jackson; Marisela Jackson; Mike Warren; Sara Diamond; Yannick Bangou | BPM 120 West Productions | 2:42 |
| 9. | "Simple" (with Babyface) | Jones; Edmonds; Kenneth Paryo; Adams II | Babyface; The Collective | 2:31 |
| 10. | "Put You On" | Jones; Elliott Bingham | Elliott; Fortune; Fridayy^{[a]} | 2:46 |
| 11. | "Plan B" | Jones; David Hughes; Steven Shaeffer; Francis LeBlanc; Hairston; Komba | Prep Bijan; Shaeffer; Fridayy | 3:15 |
| Total length: | | | | 31:35 |

Notes

- ^{^[a]} signifies an additional producer

Sample credits

- "Double Back" contains a sample of "Rain", written by Brian Alexander Morgan and Jaco Pastorius, as performed by SWV.
- "No Chaser" contains an interpolation of "Pony", written by Static Major and Timbaland, as performed by Ginuwine.

== Charts ==
| Chart (2023) | Peak position |
|---|---|
| US Heatseekers Albums (Billboard) | 6 |

== Tour ==
What I Didn't Tell You Tour
- Tour by Coco Jones
- Associated album: What I Didn't Tell You
- Start date: August 5, 2023
- End date: December 7, 2023
- Legs: 3
- No. of shows: 29
- Supporting acts: Ebony Riley; Haben; S!MONE; Savannah Ré; Tiana Major9

Coco Jones concert chronology
- What I Didn't Tell You Tour (2023); ...

The What I Didn't Tell You Tour is the debut concert tour by Coco Jones, in support of the EP of the same name (2022). Announced by Jones on June 26, 2023, via social media with the first leg currently consisting of shows across 16 cities in the United States and Canada, followed by the second leg consisting of shows across 12 cities in the United States. The first leg of the tour began at the Toyota Arena in Ontario, California on August 5, with the final tour date being held at Irving Plaza in New York City. The second North American leg started at the Theatre of Living Arts in Philadelphia, with the final North American date being held at Honeyland Festival in Houston. Ebony Riley was the supporting act for the tour, with Haben and Jones' Bel-Air co-star S!MONE (better known as Simone Joy Jones) appearing on select dates. Tickets for the North American dates went on sale on June 29.

On October 13, 2023, Jones announced a short European leg of the tour, scheduling to perform in London, Paris and Amsterdam. Tickets went on sale the same day.

=== Setlist ===
1. "Caliber"
2. "Spend It"
3. "No Chaser"
4. "Put You On"
5. "Headline"
6. "Ex-Factor" (Lauryn Hill cover)
7. "Simple"
8. "Love is War"
9. "Plan B"
10. "Double Back" / "Rain" (SWV cover)
11. "Fallin"
12. "ICU"
13. "Crazy for Me" / "Crazy in Love" (Beyoncé cover)
Notes
- In Boston and LA, she did an acapella performance of "Just My Luck" from her independent EP H.W.D.Y.
- In Chicago and Minneapolis, she performed a cover of "Until the End of Time" by Justin Timberlake and Beyoncé.
- In Charlotte, the power went out so she performed these songs a cappella; Double Back, Moment of Your Life, Love is War and Holla at the DJ
- In London, she performed an acapella version of the chorus to Me & You from the Let It Shine soundtrack

List of concerts
| Date | City | Country | Venue | Supporting act |
Leg 1 - North America
| August 5, 2023 | Ontario | United States | Toyota Arena | co-headlining show with Jhené Aiko & Queen Naija |
| August 8, 2023 | Boston | United States | Paradise Rock Club | Ebony Riley; S!MONE |
| August 10, 2023 | Toronto | Canada | Phoenix Concert Theatre | Ebony Riley; Haben; S!MONE |
| August 11, 2023 | Detroit | United States | Majestic Theatre | Ebony Riley; S!MONE |
| August 13, 2023 | Chicago | United States | House of Blues Chicago | Ebony Riley; S!MONE |
| August 15, 2023 | Minneapolis | United States | First Avenue | Ebony Riley; S!MONE |
| August 17, 2023 | Englewood | United States | Gothic Theatre | Ebony Riley; Haben; S!MONE |
| August 20, 2023 (Note: This concert was a part of Sol Blume Festival.) | Sacramento | United States | Discovery Park | —N/a |
| August 22, 2023 | Los Angeles | United States | The Fonda Theatre | Ebony Riley; S!MONE |
| August 23, 2023 | Santa Ana | United States | The Observatory | Ebony Riley; Haben; S!MONE |
| August 25, 2023 | Phoenix | United States | The Van Buren | Ebony Riley; S!MONE |
| August 27, 2023 | Dallas | United States | The Echo Lounge & Music Hall | Ebony Riley; Haben; S!MONE |
| August 28, 2023 | New Orleans | United States | House of Blues | Ebony Riley; S!MONE |
| August 29, 2023 | Birmingham | United States | Iron City | Ebony Riley; S!MONE |
| August 30, 2023 | Nashville | United States | Marathon Music Works | Ebony Riley; Haben; S!MONE |
| September 3, 2023 | Norfolk | United States | The NorVa | Ebony Riley; Haben; S!MONE |
| September 6, 2023 | New York City | United States | Irving Plaza | Ebony Riley; Haben; S!MONE |
| September 7, 2023 | New York City | United States | Irving Plaza | Ebony Riley; Haben; S!MONE |
| Leg 2 - North America | | United States | | |
| October 23, 2023 | Philadelphia | United States | Theatre of Living Arts | Ebony Riley; S!MONE |
| October 24, 2023 | Raleigh | United States | Lincoln Theatre | Ebony Riley; S!MONE |
| October 26, 2023 | Washington | United States | The Fillmore Silver Spring | Ebony Riley; S!MONE |
| October 29, 2023 (Note: This concert is a part of One MusicFest.) | Atlanta | United States | Piedmont Park | —N/a |
| October 31, 2023 | Baltimore | United States | Rams Head Live! | Ebony Riley; S!MONE |
| November 1, 2023 | Richmond | United States | The National | Ebony Riley; S!MONE |
| November 3, 2023 | Charlotte | United States | The Underground | Ebony Riley; S!MONE |
| November 4, 2023 (Note: This concert is a part of North Carolina A&T State University's Homecoming concert.) | Greensboro | United States | Greensboro Coliseum Complex | —N/a |
| November 6, 2023 | Indianapolis | United States | Deluxe at Old National Centre | Ebony Riley; S!MONE |
| November 7, 2023 | Cleveland | United States | House of Blues Cleveland | Ebony Riley; S!MONE |
| November 9, 2023 | St. Louis | United States | Delmar Hall | Ebony Riley; S!MONE |
| November 12, 2023 (Note: This concert is a part of Honeyland Festival.) | Houston | United States | Sugar Land | —N/a |
Leg 3 - UK & Europe
| December 4, 2023 | London | England | KOKO (Note: The original venue for this concert was The Jazz Cafe, but was upgraded due to high demand.) | Savannah Ré; Tiana Major9 |
| December 5, 2023 | Paris | France | Bataclan (Note: The original venue for this concert was Les Étoiles, but was upgraded due to high demand.) | Savannah Ré |
| December 7, 2023 | Amsterdam | Netherlands | Paradiso | Savannah Ré |
