= RuffNation Records =

American record label

Ruffnation Films
- Company type: Film Company
- Founded: 1999
- Headquarters: Philadelphia, PA, USA
- Key people: Chris Schwartz, Kevon Glickman & Rich Murray
- Parent: MNRK Music Group
- Website: ruffnationentertainment.com

RuffNation Records was a joint venture record label between Chris Schwartz and Warner Bros. Records. It was started in 1999 after Ruffhouse Records was dissolved and remained active until 2001 when AOL bought Time Warner. The label was reactivated in 2020 as RuffNation Entertainment. The label is currently distributed by MNRK Music Group.

== See also ==
- List of record labels
