= Larger than Life (mixtape) =

Mixtape by Brent Faiyaz
- Released: October 27, 2023
- Recorded: 2022
- Length: 36:23
- Label: ISO Supremacy; UnitedMasters
- Producer: Ashani Allick (exec.); 1stFrom92; Anthoine Walters; AR; Berg; Dpat; Jamie McLaughlin; Jonah Roy; Jonathan Wells; Mannyvelli; Otxhello; Sparkheem; SpizzleDoe; Tommy Richman; Williskeating

Brent Faiyaz chronology
Too Late to Die Young (2022)	Larger than Life (2023)	Icon (2026)

Singles from Larger than Life
- 1. "Moment of Your Life" Released: August 23, 2023; 2. "WY@" Released: September 19, 2023

Larger than Life is American R&B singer Brent Faiyaz's debut mixtape. It was released independently through Faiyaz's label ISO Supremacy and distributed through UnitedMasters on October 27, 2023, as a surprise release. The project features guest appearances from ASAP Ant, ASAP Rocky, Babyface Ray, Coco Jones, Cruddy Murda, Felix!, Flee, Lil Gray, Missy Elliott, N3WYRKLA, Princess Cro, Tommy Richman, and TTM Dawg. The majority of the album was produced by Dpat alongside Mannyvelli and Sparkheem who also produced several tracks on the project.

Larger than Life received generally positive reviews from critics who highlighted Faiyaz's vocals and the album's "sleek" production. It debuted at number 11 on the US Billboard 200 chart, in which it earned 42,000 album-equivalent units, of which 1,000 were pure album sales. Eight of the album's fourteen tracks charted on the Hot R&B/Hip-Hop Songs chart. The mixtape was preceded by two singles: the Coco Jones-assisted "Moment of Your Life" and "WY@".

== Background and recording ==
Upon the release of the mixtape, Faiyaz appeared in an interview with Rolling Stone in which he spoke about how astrology plays a part in the creation of his music as he's always surrounded by women who he states are "the number one conversation" he has with them. When asked about the mixtape's thirteenth cut, "WY@", Faiyaz stated that the "record reflects having access and opportunity, and having to say no to certain shit—or the inability to say no to certain shit" and it's "about addiction in a way, shape, or form, but more from the perspective of submitting to it versus fighting against it". In November 2023, Faiyaz appeared in another interview with Swizz Beatz on behalf of Wonderland. In the interview, Swizz asked about the inspiration behind the project's title, to which Faiyaz responded that: "I'm kind of in a place where I feel like I can do whatever the fuck I wanna do. I feel like I'm one of the best at what I do. That's how I feel with Larger than Life". A standout point of the mixtape was the abundance of features it debuted with. When asked about what made Faiyaz comfortable enough to pull all the artists together, he went into depth about the process:

I just pull from what I like, man. I do what feels good to me. It would be more difficult for me to chase streams and make something that fits with what everyone else is doing. With every project I put together, it’s the project I want to hear right now. If I was looking at a 15-year-old me, and it’s back to school time, what would I want my favourite artist to put out? That’s how I make music.

In the same month, Sonder member and one of the mixtape's primary producers, Dpat appeared in an interview with Billboard in which he revealed that he and Faiyaz began to work on the project in December 2022 after landing in Tulum, Quintana Roo. He stated that the majority of the songs on the mixtape were "made [during] that one week at lock-in with a couple made throughout the year" and that Faiyaz was "writing one, two songs every day". He expanded on how he and Faiyaz originally met, while also covering Timbaland's involvement on the record and the recording and production process of the mixtape:

We did a studio lock-in for this album. [It] was basically a studio in a hotel that Brent booked for a week straight. So, it was just wake up, [go to the] studio until ungodly hours, go to sleep, wake up, studio. On the sixth day of this lock-in, Brent was like, “Oh, Timbaland’s coming to the studio and I want him to be talking on an intro.” I was like, okay, cool, let me make a beat. In my head, I’m thinking, What could be cool for Timbaland to talk on? All of us [grew] up listening to Timbo talk his shit, beatboxing, the ad-libs—they’re just so iconic. And so, in my mind, I’m like I want this to be a statement.

== Release and promotion ==
On May 2, 2023, Billboard reported that Brent Faiyaz signed a new distributed deal with UnitedMasters, rumored to be valued at up to $50 million. UnitedMasters CEO, Steve Stoute, spoke on the addition of Faiyaz to the company: "Brent Faiyaz is one of the most prolific independent artists today, and we are extremely excited to embark on this new partnership with him. It's been inspiring to watch his journey as an artist over the years, and with this partnership we look to further amplify his creative vision and support his entrepreneurial ambitions".

On August 16, 2023, Billboard reported the start-up of Faiyaz's new record label and creative company, ISO Supremacy, distributed by UnitedMasters ahead of a new project. On August 23, 2023, Faiyaz released the album's lead single, "Moment of Your Life" featuring Coco Jones. Just a month later, on September 19, 2023, Faiyaz released the album’s second single, "WY@".

Just hours before the release of the album, on October 26, 2023, Faiyaz shared the official album trailer on his YouTube channel and social media pages to announce the album to his fans. On December 8, 2023, Brent released the Lone Wolf-directed music video for "Upset", featuring Tommy Richman and FELIX. On December 15, 2023, Brent released a "Chopped Not Slopped" remix of the album with ISO Supremacy and DJ Candlestick. On January 16, 2024, Brent released the OffBucksFilms-directed official music video for "Pistachios". On February 14, 2024, Brent released the music video for "WY@", starring Mexican-Kenyan actress, Lupita Nyong'o. The video was purposely set to be released on Valentine's Day due to the song's lyrical topics.

== Critical reception ==
Larger than Life ratings
Review scores
Source	Rating
AllMusic	3.5/5 stars
Pitchfork	7/10

Larger Than Life received generally favorable reviews from critics. AllMusic's TiVo Staff stated that the project allows Brent to stay "in a loop of nostalgia for much of his first mixtape". He wrote that "Faiyaz channels late-'90s radio R&B production on the staggered percussion beats" and that the production is similar to The Neptunes'. He concluded his review as he wrote that "Larger Than Life is light fun for the most part, and the retro styles are counterbalanced by blunt-edged rap features". Writing for Pitchfork, Alphonse Pierre wrote that the album is "a life-is-good album where Faiyaz could easily have chosen to pop champagne to his success by bringing all of today's most powerful rap and R&B artists into the fold", however, "he pays homage to his home by getting both regional pioneers and up-and-comers involved in his mess". Pierre notes that "Faiyaz sings about stories that would be the highlight of most people’s year like it’s just another day".

=== Year-end lists ===
Select year-end rankings of Larger than Life
Publication	List	Rank	Ref.
Billboard	The 50 Best Albums of 2023: Staff List	37	
Complex	The 50 Best Albums Of 2023	28	
Stereogum	The 50 Best Albums Of 2023	30	
Jem Aswad for Variety	The Best Albums of 2023	1	
Steven J. Horowitz for Variety	The Best Albums of 2023	8	
Vibe	The 20 Best R&B Albums Of 2023	20	

== Commercial performance ==
Larger than Life debuted at number eleven on the US Billboard 200 chart, earning 42,000 album-equivalent units (including 1,000 copies in pure album sales) in its first week. This became Brent Faiyaz's third US top-twenty debut on the chart. The album also accumulated a total of 54.1 million on-demand official streams from the set's tracks. Eight of Larger than Life's tracks had charted on the Hot R&B/Hip-Hop Songs chart.

== Track listing ==
Larger than Life track listing
No.	Title	Writer(s)	Producer(s)	Length
1.	"Tim's Intro"	Christopher Brent Wood; Timothy Mosley; David Patino; Jason Avalos; Terrence Davis	Dpat; Mannyvelli; Sparkheem	2:04
2.	"Last One Left" (featuring Lil Gray and Missy Elliott)	Wood; Khalil Wright; Melissa Elliott; Patino	Dpat	3:44
3.	"Forever Yours"	Wood; Jonah Roy; Rich Paul	Roy	1:36
4.	"Best Time"	Wood; Patino; Kelis Rogers; Thomas Richman	Dpat	1:22
5.	"Big Mad Skit" (featuring Flee and Princess Cro)	Afolabi Rosiji; Aheko Shorter; Chidozie Arah; Emmanuel Arah; Juan Wood II; Davis		1:18
6.	"Moment of Your Life" (featuring Coco Jones)	Wood; Courtney Jones; Patino; Donald Holmes; E. Arah; Gerard Thomas; Elliott; Terrance	Dpat; Mannyvelli; Sparkheem	3:14
7.	"Outside All Night" (with ASAP Rocky and N3wyrkla)	Wood; Nyla Nasir; Rakim Mayers; Roy	Roy	3:22
8.	"Wherever I Go"	Wood; William Keating; Thomas McLaughlin; Anthony Rampias; C. Arah; Elliot Davy	1stFrom92; AR; McLaughlin; SpizzleDoe; Williskeating	3:01
9.	"Upset" (with Tommy Richman and Felix!)	Wood; Richman; Roobyns Felix; E. Arah	Mannyvelli; Tommy Richman	2:57
10.	"On This Side" (featuring ASAP Ant and Cruddy Murda)	Wood; Adam Kirkman; Colombian Thomas; Johnathan Buck; C. Arah; Anthony Round; Davis; Darnell Smith; Dennis Round	Mannyvelli; Sparkheem; SpizzleDoe	2:58
11.	"Dawged Em Skit" (featuring TTM Dawg)	Patino; Jamal Harris		1:04
12.	"Belong to You" (featuring Babyface Ray)	Wood; Marcellus Register; Patino; Jerome Woods	Dpat	2:57
13.	"WY@"	Wood; Patino; Bailey Goldberg; Anthoine Walters; Othello Houston; Jonathan Wells	Dpat; Berg; Anthoine Walters; Otxhello; Jonathan Wells	3:27
14.	"Pistachios"	Wood; Isaac Hayes; William Young; Adina Howard; Rochad Holiday; Curtis Wilson	Dpat	3:09
Total length:				36:23

Sample credits

- "Tim's Intro" contains a sample of "No Scrubs" as performed by TLC, written by Kevin "She'kspere" Briggs, Kandi Burruss, Tameka "Tiny" Cottle, and Lisa Lopes
- "Last One Left" contains a sample of "Crazy Feelings" as performed by Missy Elliott, written by Melissa Elliott and Timothy Mosley
- "Forever Yours" contains a sample of "Fafo" as performed by Zack Fox, written by Zachary Fox and Benjamin Fort
- "Best Time" contains a sample of "Caught Out There" as performed by Kelis, written by Pharrell Williams and Chad Hugo
- "Moment of Your Life" contains a sample of "Boy You Should Listen" as performed by Lady Wray, written by Nicole Wray and Melissa Elliott
- "Belong To You" contains a sample of "I Belong to You (Every Time I See Your Face)" as performed by Rome, written by Jerome Woods and Gerald Baillergeau
- "Pistachios" contains a sample of "If We Make Love Tonight" as performed by Adina Howard, written by Curtis Wilson, Jeff Young, and Rochad Holiday

== Charts ==
=== Weekly charts ===
Weekly chart performance for Larger than Life
Chart (2023)	Peak position
Belgian Albums (Ultratop Flanders)	61
Belgian Albums (Ultratop Wallonia)	68
Canadian Albums (Billboard)	21
Danish Albums (Hitlisten)	38
Dutch Albums (Album Top 100)	37
Irish Albums (IRMA)	61
Lithuanian Albums (AGATA)	32
New Zealand Albums (RMNZ)	7
Norwegian Albums (VG-lista)	29
Swiss Albums (Schweizer Hitparade)	16
UK Albums (OCC)	25
US Billboard 200	11
US Top R&B/Hip-Hop Albums (Billboard)	4

=== Year-end charts ===
Year-end chart performance for Larger than Life
Chart (2024)	Position
US Billboard 200	157
US Top R&B/Hip-Hop Albums (Billboard)	66

== Certifications ==
Certifications for Larger than Life
Region	Certification	Certified units/sales
New Zealand (RMNZ)	Gold	7,500^{‡}
United Kingdom (BPI)	Silver	60,000^{‡}
United States (RIAA)	Gold	500,000^{‡}
^{‡} Sales+streaming figures based on certification alone.

== Release history ==
Release dates and formats for Larger than Life
Region	Date	Label(s)	Format(s)	Edition(s)	Ref.
Various	October 27, 2023	ISO Supremacy; UnitedMasters	Digital download; streaming	Standard	
United States	October 27, 2023	ISO Supremacy; UnitedMasters	CD	Standard	
Various	December 15, 2023	ISO Supremacy; UnitedMasters	Digital download; streaming	Chopped Not Slopped	
United States	September 19, 2024	ISO Supremacy; UnitedMasters	LP	Standard	
