= For Me =

2024 song by Loe Shimmy

Single by Loe Shimmy featuring Brent Faiyaz

from the album Zombieland 2 and Nardy World
- Released: March 22, 2024
- Length: 1:44
- Label: Open Shift
- Songwriters: Shamar Cox; Corey Harris
- Producer: Hi Tech Corey

Loe Shimmy featuring Brent Faiyaz singles chronology
| "Substance Abuse" (2024) | "For Me" (2024) | "3am" (2025) |

Brent Faiyaz singles chronology
| "WY@" (2023) | "For Me (Remix)" (2024) | "Peter Pan" (2025) |

Music video
- "For Me" on YouTube

Remix music video
- "For Me (Remix)" on YouTube

"For Me" is a song by American rapper Loe Shimmy, released on March 22, 2024 from his third studio album, Zombieland 2 (2024). An official remix of the song with American singer Brent Faiyaz was released on November 7, 2024 as the fifth single from Shimmy's third mixtape, Nardy World, which was released a day later. It is his first entry on the Billboard Hot 100, debuting and peaking at number 78.

== Background ==
The video-sharing app TikTok has contributed to the growing attention of the song, which soundtracked more than 163,000 clips on the platform in November 2024. The remix with Brent Faiyaz, which was used in over already been used in over 5,000 TikTok videos in that month, has helped the song gain wider recognition. The song amassed 6.3 million official U.S. streams (up 138%) and 1.1 million radio airplay audience impressions (up 2%) in the November 8–14 tracking week, according to Luminate.

== Critical reception ==
Zachary Horvath of HotNewHipHop gave a positive review of the remix, writing "Given the stark stylistic difference of these two, you would think this collaboration would have zero chance. Well, to be honest, it's actually pretty decent. Faiyaz comes in with some of his smoothest vocals to date over the understated and lowkey skittering production. He steals the show to some degree, and we wouldn't mind hearing him over the beat by himself someday."

== Charts ==
Chart performance for "For Me"
| Chart (2024) | Peak position |
|---|---|
| US Billboard Hot 100 (Billboard) | 78 |
| US Hot R&B/Hip-Hop Songs (Billboard) | 20 |
