= ICU (song) =

2022 single by Coco Jones

Single by Coco Jones

from the EP What I Didn't Tell You
- Released: October 21, 2022
- Genre: R&B
- Length: 4:01
- Label: High Standardz; Def Jam
- Songwriters: Courtney Jones; Darhyl Camper; Raymond Komba; Roy Rockette; Travis Simmons
- Producer: DJ Camper

Coco Jones singles chronology
"Caliber" (2022)	"ICU" (2022)	"Double Back" (2023)

Music video
- "ICU" on YouTube

"ICU" is a song by American singer Coco Jones, released on October 21, 2022, as the second single from her EP What I Didn't Tell You (2022). Produced by DJ Camper, it is her first song to chart, peaking at number 62 on the Billboard Hot 100. The title references the lyrics "I see you" more than intensive care unit. It won the award for Best R&B Performance at the 66th Annual Grammy Awards.

== Background and composition ==
"ICU" is an R&B ballad containing piano, guitar and drums in the production. Lyrically, Coco Jones reflects on being attracted to her lover; she suggests they should just be friends, and that she does not have a specific partner in mind, but finds it unbearable to live without the man in question.

Coco Jones has stated, " "ICU" is about the push and pull of being in a relationship where the circumstances have changed. Growing in our career and personal goals, but growing apart at the same time."

== Critical reception ==
Antwane Folk of Rated R&B praised Jones' performance, commenting that the song "unquestionably showcases the power of her quality vocal range."

== Commercial performance ==
"ICU" debuted at number 88 via the Billboard Hot 100 on April 1, 2023. The single remained a mainstay on the charts for 20 weeks, eventually rising and peaking on July 29, 2023 at number 62. In addition, the single peaked at number 1 on Billboard’s R&B/hip-hop Airplay chart.

On December 12, 2025, "ICU" was certified double platinum by the Recording Industry Association of America (RIAA), which denotes track-equivalent sales of two million units.

"ICU" was nominated at the 66th Annual Grammy Awards for two awards: Best R&B Performance and Best R&B Song, eventually winning for Best R&B Performance.

== Live performances ==
Jones performed "ICU" at the 2022 Soul Train Music Awards, The Jennifer Hudson Show, The Tonight Show Starring Jimmy Fallon, iHeart Living Black and the 2023 BET Awards shortly after receiving the award for Best New Artist. She also performed in appearances for Genius, Vevo, MTV Push and SiriusXM. She has performed it at various festivals like Essence Fest & Broccoli City Fest.

== Remix ==
On July 12, 2023, a remix with American singer Justin Timberlake was announced by Jones on social media. The remix was released two days later.

== Charts ==
=== Weekly charts ===
Chart performance for "ICU"
Chart (2023)	Peak position
New Zealand Hot Singles (RMNZ)	29
US Billboard Hot 100	62
US Hot R&B/Hip-Hop Songs (Billboard)	16
US Rhythmic Airplay (Billboard)	23

Chart performance for "ICU" (Remix) featuring Justin Timberlake
Chart (2023)	Peak position
New Zealand Hot Singles (RMNZ)	38
Suriname (Nationale Top 40)	5

=== Year-end charts ===
Year-end chart performance for "ICU"
Chart (2023)	Position
US Hot R&B/Hip-Hop Songs (Billboard)	45

== Certifications ==
Certifications for "ICU"
Region	Certification	Certified units/sales
New Zealand (RMNZ)	Gold	15,000^{‡}
United States (RIAA)	2× Platinum	2,000,000^{‡}
^{‡} Sales+streaming figures based on certification alone.

== Release history ==
Release history for “ICU”
Region	Date	Type	Label	Ref.
United States	October 21, 2022	Original	High Standardz; Def Jam	
United States	July 14, 2023	Remix	High Standardz; Def Jam	
