= Coco Jones =

American actress and singer-songwriter (born 1998)

- Jones in 2025

Background information
- Born: Courtney Michaela Ann Jones; January 4, 1998 (age 28); Columbia, South Carolina, U.S.
- Origin: Lebanon, Tennessee, U.S.
- Genres: R&B; pop; soul
- Occupations: Singer-songwriter; actress
- Years active: 2006–present
- Labels: Hollywood; High Standardz; Def Jam
- Publisher: Warner Chappell Music
- Father: Mike Jones
- Spouse: Donovan Mitchell (m. 2026)
- Award: Grammy Award Winner
- Website: therealcocojones.com

Courtney Michaela Ann Jones (born January 4, 1998) is an American singer-songwriter and actress. She first appeared on the competition series Radio Disney's Next Big Thing (2010–2011), which led to her signing with the company's Hollywood Records and being cast in several Disney Channel properties — including the sketch comedy So Random! (2011–2012) and the sitcom Good Luck Charlie (2012–2013). She had her breakthrough role as Roxanne "Roxy" Andrews in the 2012 television musical DCOM Let It Shine, where she co-starred with Tyler James Williams and lent her vocals to the soundtrack for the network.

She returned to a recording career in 2022, signing with High Standardz and Def Jam Recordings to release the single "ICU" in October of that year. The song was her first entry on the Billboard Hot 100 and received platinum certification by the Recording Industry Association of America (RIAA), also winning Best R&B Performance at the 66th Annual Grammy Awards. The award was among five total nominations she received at the 66th Annual Grammy Awards—which included a nomination for Best New Artist. That same year, she was cast in the starring role for the Peacock drama series Bel-Air (2022–2025). Her other accolades include a BET Award and an NAACP Image Award.

Her debut studio album, Why Not More? (2025), moderately entered the Billboard 200 and was met with critical acclaim, earning Jones her second Best R&B Album nomination at the 68th Annual Grammy Awards. Its lead single, "Here We Go (Uh Oh)", was also nominated for Best R&B Song at the 67th Annual Grammy Awards.

== Early life ==
Jones was born on January 4, 1998 in Columbia, South Carolina. She is the daughter of former NFL player Mike Jones and session vocalist Javonda Jones, and was raised in Lebanon, Tennessee. She has three siblings: older brother, Steven, younger brother, Mike Jones Jr., who formerly played football for LSU, and younger sister Aja.

Jones showed a passion for music at an early age, performing "America the Beautiful" at her kindergarten graduation. At the age of nine, she met with the casting heads for Disney and joined the company as an actor and songwriter.

== Career ==
=== 2006–2013: Early career with Disney and Hollywood Records ===
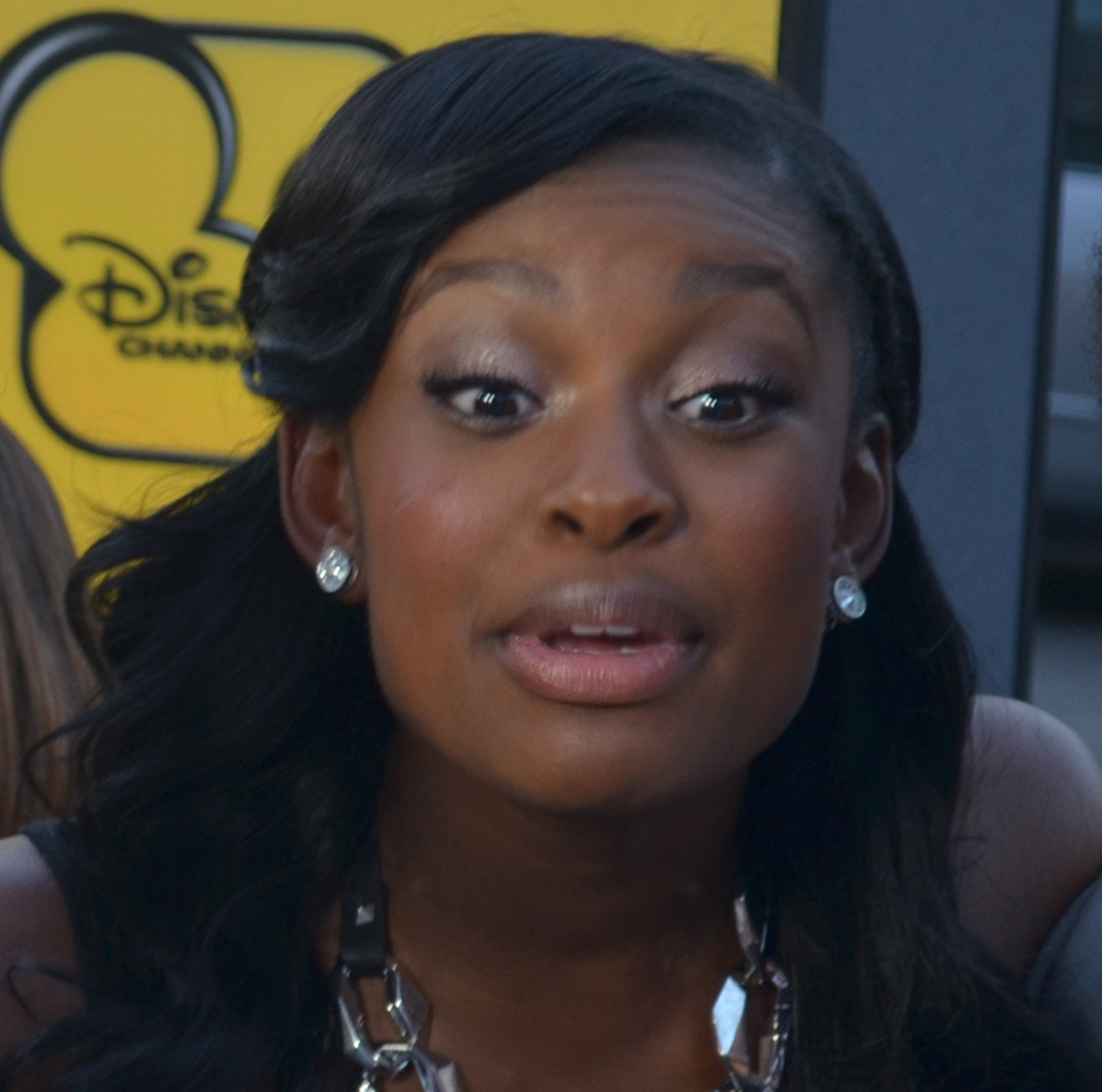
Jones in 2012

In 2006, Jones competed on Radio Disney, where she became known for her song, "Real You". In 2009, she was chosen to perform live on "The Most Talented Kids" episode of the Maury Povich Show. In 2011, she guest-starred on Disney Channel's television series So Random!. In 2010, Jones was the runner up during season 3 of Radio Disney's The Next Big Thing singing competition. Shortly after, she released her debut project Coco Jones, and began a concert tour revolving around the theme of anti-bullying called UBU-Stop the Bullying.

In June 2012, Jones played the lead role of Roxie in the television Disney movie, Let It Shine. The movie was the most watched Disney Channel Original Movie and most watched movie of the year for kids and tweens in 2012. Jones and the other main cast of Let It Shine performed at the 43rd Annual NAACP Image Awards Nominees Luncheon prior to the movie's release.

Jones signed a record deal with Hollywood Records and began working with Grammy-nominated producer Rob Galbraith, co-writing and recording all-new original music. Jones' debut single "Holla at the DJ" premiered on Radio Disney on December 6, 2012, with its release on iTunes the next day. The video for the track premiered on the Disney Channel on December 12, with a premiere on VEVO just afterwards. Her extended play Made Of was released on March 12, 2013, and it reached the top 10 of the Billboard Heatseekers chart. She toured with Mindless Behavior later that year. Jones performed with Mindless Behavior at Radio Disney's Radio Disney Music Awards, and took home an award for "Funniest Celebrity Take." Following the release of the EP, Jones worked in the studio with David Banner, Ester Dean, and Jukebox, with plans to release her debut album by August.

=== 2014–2022: Independent music and acting roles ===
In 2014, Jones was dropped from Hollywood Records. In August 2014, she put out a video for the song, "Pepermint", and made it available on digital platforms a month later.

In July 2017, Jones was featured in a Fanta commercial. In April 2018, Jones was featured in 1950s-era jazz film, Flock of Four. In September of that year, she released a song, called "Just My Luck", along with its music video.

On September 3, 2019, Jones released a song, called "Depressed". On September 20, she released an 8-track EP, titled H.D.W.Y..

In August 2020, it was announced Jones will appear in the upcoming holiday film, White Elephant, and horror film, Vampires vs. the Bronx. In September 2020, Jones talked about her negative experiences in the industry with colorism. According to her, executives decided she was not marketable enough after featuring in Let It Shine. In November 2020, Jones released the single, "Hollyweird".

In September 2021, Jones was cast in Peacock drama series, Bel-Air, a reimagining of hit sitcom, The Fresh Prince of Bel-Air, in the role of Hilary Banks. The show would premiere in February 2022.

=== 2022–present: Signing to Def Jam Recordings, What I Didn't Tell You and Why Not More? ===
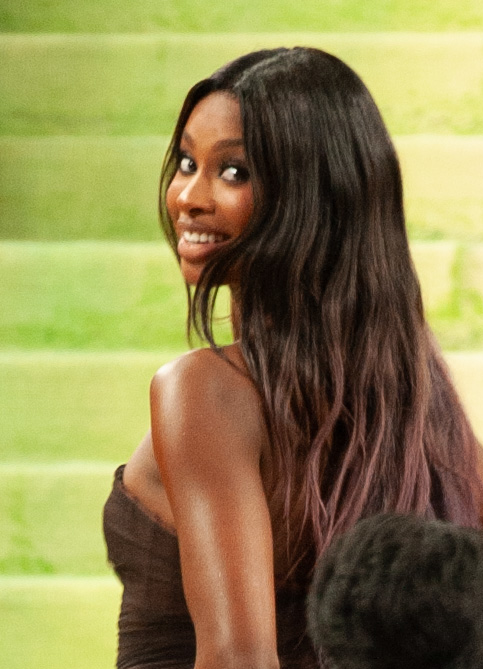
Jones at the 2026 Met Gala

On March 20, 2022, Jones announced that she had signed a new artist deal with High Standardz and Def Jam Recordings. Her major label debut single "Caliber" was released on March 25, 2022, and also served as the lead single for her major label debut EP What I Didn't Tell You. After the release of the EP's second single, "ICU"; as well as the non-album Amazon Music exclusive single, "Love is War", the EP was released on November 4, 2022. Just a month prior to the EP's release, Jones was featured on Babyface's ninth album, Girls Night Out, contributing vocals to the song, "Simple". The music video for the song was also released a week later on October 31.

On January 20, 2023, Jones released the deluxe edition to her EP, which includes a song, "Simple", and three new tracks. Jones' single, "ICU", reached number 21 on the Billboard R&B/Hip-Hop Airplay chart, and peaked at number 63 on the Billboard Hot 100, her first entry on both charts. On 30 January 2024, Jones signed an exclusive publishing deal with Warner Chappell Music. On February 10, Jones released "Love is War" on all streaming platforms, and four days later, released a Spotify-exclusive cover of "Until the End of Time" with Leon Thomas.

On April 6, 2024, Jones performed the National Anthem at night one of WrestleMania XL in Philadelphia, Pennsylvania. On August 9, Jones partnered with Disney for a reimagined release of Princess Tiana’s "Almost There". On August 16, Jones released a promotional single, "Sweep It Up", with an accompanying visualizer and lyric video. On November 22, Jones released her sixth extended play, Coco by the Fireplace. On April 25, 2025, Jones released her debut studio album, Why Not More?.

== Musical style and influences ==
Jones has said that many famous artists have inspired her music. Some of her biggest musical influences include Beyoncé, Whitney Houston, Mariah Carey, Aaliyah, Aretha Franklin, Brandy Norwood, Mary J. Blige, Christina Aguilera, Celine Dion, Jazmine Sullivan, Britney Spears, Etta James, Roberta Flack, Jennifer Hudson, and CeCe Winans.

== Personal life ==
On July 11, 2025, Jones announced her engagement to basketball player Donovan Mitchell, after two years of dating. They were married in Greenwich, Connecticut, on August 1, 2026.

== Discography ==
Studio album

- Why Not More? (2025)

Extended plays

- Coco Jones (2010)
- Made Of (2013)
- Let Me Check It (2017)
- H.D.W.Y. (2019)
- What I Didn't Tell You (2022)
- Coco by the Fireplace (2024)

== Filmography ==
=== Film ===
Year	Title	Role	Notes
2016	Grandma's House	Kimberley	
2017	Flock of Four	Ava Moore	
2020	Vampires vs. the Bronx	Rita	
2026	Strung	Jasmine	
2027	Ice Age: Boiling Point	Peaches	Voice

=== Television ===
Year	Title	Role	Notes
2011–2012	So Random!	Coco Blue	Recurring role, 5 episodes
2012	Let It Shine	Roxanne "Roxie" Andrews	Television film
2012–2013	Good Luck Charlie	Kelsey	Recurring role (seasons 3–4), 5 episodes
2014	The Exes	Vanessa	Episode: "Oh Brother Here Art Thou"
2018	Five Points	Jayla	Recurring role
2021–2022	T and Coco	Herself/host	YouTube series
2022–2025	Bel-Air	Hillary Banks	Main role
2025	The Voice	Herself/Advisor	Season 27 for Team Legend

== Live performances and tours ==
=== Stage acting ===
Year	Production	Role	Venue	Notes
2008	A Bronx Tale	Jane	Paper Mill Playhouse	

=== Tours ===
- What I Didn't Tell You Tour (2023)
- Why Not More? Tour (2025)

=== As a supporting act ===
- The Boy Is Mine Tour (2025) (Brandy and Monica)

== Awards and nominations ==
Award	Year	Category	Work	Result	Ref.
BET Awards	2022	Best Actress	Bel-Air	Nominated	
BET Awards	2023	Best Actress	Bel-Air	Nominated	
BET Awards	2023	Best New Artist	Herself	Won	
BET Awards	2024	Best Actress	Bel-Air	Nominated	
BET Awards	2025	Best Actress	Bel-Air	Nominated	
BET Awards	2025	Best Female R&B/Pop Artist	Herself	Nominated	
BET Awards	2026	Best Female R&B/Pop Artist	Herself	Nominated	
BET Awards	2026	Best Actress	Herself	Nominated	
Give Her FlowHERS Awards	2022	My Sister's Keeper Award	Herself and Akira Akbar	Won	
Grammy Awards	2024	Best R&B Performance	"ICU"	Won	
Grammy Awards	2024	Best R&B Song	"ICU"	Nominated	
Grammy Awards	2024	Best R&B Album	What I Didn't Tell You (Deluxe)	Nominated	
Grammy Awards	2024	Best Traditional R&B Performance	"Simple" (with Babyface)	Nominated	
Grammy Awards	2024	Best New Artist	Herself	Nominated	
Grammy Awards	2025	Best R&B Performance	"Here We Go (Uh Oh)"	Nominated	
Grammy Awards	2025	Best R&B Song	"Here We Go (Uh Oh)"	Nominated	
Grammy Awards	2026	Best R&B Album	Why Not More?	Nominated	
NAACP Image Awards	2023	Outstanding New Artist	Herself	Won	
NAACP Image Awards	2024	Outstanding Soul/R&B Song	"ICU" Remix (with Justin Timberlake)	Won	
NAACP Image Awards	2024	Outstanding Duo, Group or Collaboration (Traditional)	"ICU" Remix (with Justin Timberlake)	Nominated	
Soul Train Awards	2022	Best New Artist	Herself	Nominated	
Soul Train Awards	2023	Best New Artist	Herself	Won	
Soul Train Awards	2023	Best R&B/Soul Female Artist	Herself	Nominated	
Soul Train Awards	2023	Album of the Year	What I Didn't Tell You (Deluxe)	Nominated	
Soul Train Awards	2023	Song of the Year	"ICU"	Nominated	
Soul Train Awards	2023	The Ashford & Simpson Songwriter's Award	"ICU"	Nominated	
Soul Train Awards	2023	Video of the Year	"ICU"	Nominated	
