= Loe Shimmy =

American rapper (born 1999)

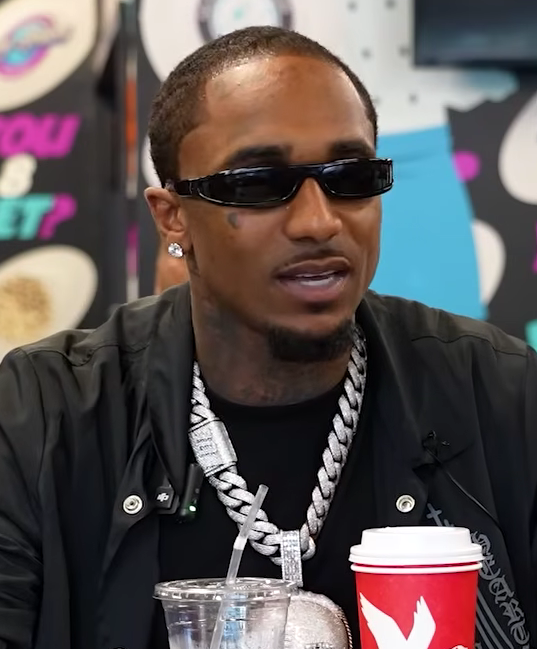
- Cox in 2026

Background information
- Born: Shamar Williams Cox; March 24, 1999 (age 27); Pompano Beach, Florida, U.S.
- Genres: Southern hip-hop; trap
- Occupation: Rapper
- Years active: 2020–present
- Labels: Rebel; gamma.; Open Shift Distribution

Shamar Williams Cox (born March 24, 1999), known professionally as Loe Shimmy, is an American rapper from Pompano Beach, Florida. His music has been described as having a "laid-back sound" and a distinctive "wobbly nasal croak". He is best known for his singles "For Me" and "3am" (with Don Toliver).

== Early life ==
Shamar Williams Cox grew up in Pompano Beach, Florida. As an adolescent he played football in the free safety position.

== Career ==
Cox began his music career in 2020, releasing music on SoundCloud. In 2020, he released his debut EP, Zombie Land. He released his World War Z EP later that year. His debut album, Zuper PowerZ, was released in 2021. He released his second full-length project, Z End, in 2022.

He went on a two-year hiatus following the death of his brother due to gun violence.

He featured on Kodak Black's 2023 album Pistolz & Pearlz.

In March 2024, he released his album Zombieland 2, which charted on the Billboard Heatseekers chart. The EP contained the song "For Me", which debut at 78 on the Billboard Hot 100 chart. In June 2024, he released a deluxe edition to Zombieland 2, titled Zombieland 2.6. He supported Sexyy Redd's Sexyy Red 4 President Tour and Rob49 & Skilla Baby's Vultures Eat The Most Tour in 2024. In October 2024, he released The Z Files, which contained a number of remasters of previous songs. He released Nardy World in November 2024, which contained a remix to "For Me" featuring Brent Faiyaz. The album was dedicated to his late brother, Nardy.

He opened for Lil Baby's WHAM tour in 2025 and performed at 2025 Rolling Loud California. In June 2025, he was selected as a 2025 XXL Freshman. He released his album Rockstar Junkie on July 18, 2025. The single "3am" with Don Toliver, from Rockstar Junkie, peaked at number 71 on the Billboard Hot 100.

== Artistry ==
His music has been described as having a "laid-back sound" with "melodic yet coarse songs that combine old-school and contemporary Southern rap" and a distinctive "wobbly nasal croak".

He has called Future and the Weeknd as inspirations for his music.

== Discography ==
=== Studio albums ===
| Title | Album details | Peak chart positions |
| Title | Album details | US |
|---|---|---|
| Zombieland 2 | Released: March 22, 2024; Label: Open Shift; Format: LP, digital download, streaming | — |
| Rockstar Junkie | Released: July 18, 2025; Label: Rebel, Gamma; Format: Digital download, streaming | — |
| Pretty Girlz Run the World | Released: July 24, 2026; Label: Rebel, Gamma; Format: Digital download, streaming | 68 |

=== Compilation albums ===
| Title | EP details |
|---|---|
| The Z Files | Released: October 4, 2024; Label: Open Shift; Format: Digital download, streaming |

=== Mixtapes ===
| Title | EP details |
|---|---|
| Zuper Powerz | Released: June 26, 2021; Label: Self-released; Format: Digital download, streaming |
| Z End | Released: March 23, 2022; Label: Self-released; Format: Digital download, streaming |
| Nardy World | Released: November 8, 2024; Label: Open Shift; Format: Digital download, streaming |

=== Extended plays ===
| Title | EP details |
|---|---|
| Zombie Land | Released: April 18, 2020; Label: Self-released; Format: Digital download, streaming |
| World War Z | Released: November 26, 2020; Label: Self-released; Format: Digital download, streaming |

=== Charted singles ===
| Title | Year | Peak chart positions | | Certifications | Album |
| Title | Year | US | US R&B/HH | Certifications | Album |
|---|---|---|---|---|---|
| "For Me" (solo or remix with Brent Faiyaz) | 2024 | 78 | 20 | RIAA: Gold; RIAA: Gold (remix) | Zombieland 2 and Nardy World |
| "3am" (with Don Toliver) | 2025 | 71 | 14 | RIAA: Gold | Rockstar Junkie |

=== Other charted songs ===
| Title | Year | Peak chart positions | | | | Album |
| Title | Year | US | US R&B/HH | CAN | WW | Album |
|---|---|---|---|---|---|---|
| "I Need Us" (with Rob49) | 2025 | — | 46 | — | — | Let Me Fly |
| "I'm Spent" (with Drake) | 2026 | 34 | 23 | 55 | 63 | Habibti |
