= UnitedMasters =

Company service in Brooklyn, New York, United States

- Company type: Private
- Industry: Music
- Founded: November 2017
- Founder: Steve Stoute
- Headquarters: New York City, United States
- Area served: Worldwide
- Website: www.unitedmasters.com

UnitedMasters is an American music distributor founded by Steve Stoute in November 2017. On October 21, 2020, in a song released by rapper YoungBoy Never Broke Again titled "The Story of O.J. (Top Version)", he first noted owning a percentage of the company. Less than three years later, on a music podcast released February 16, 2023, the Baton Rouge rapper again noted that he owns a percentage of the company and has had several talks with Stoute.

== History ==
=== Formation ===
UnitedMasters was launched in November 2017 by Steve Stoute with a $70 million Series A led by Google's corporate umbrella Alphabet alongside venture firm Andreessen Horowitz and 21st Century Fox.

=== Music distribution ===
In 2018, UnitedMasters rolled out the distribution feature on its platform titled Releases. The Releases feature allows artists to upload their music and album artwork and distribute their music to all major streaming services through the UnitedMasters platform.

In 2019, UnitedMasters announced the appointment of its first President, Lauren Wirtzer-Seawood. Wirtzer-Seawood formerly served as Head of Music Partnerships at Instagram. Prior to that, Wirtzer-Seawood spent two years as the Head of Digital at Beyoncé's entertainment and management company, Parkwood Entertainment.

In 2022, UnitedMasters distributed songs for FIFA World Cup Qatar 2022 by cooperating with artists like Nora Fatehi, Rahma Riad, Balqees, Manal and RedOne.

=== Partnerships ===
In 2018, UnitedMasters announced a global partnership with the NBA.

In early 2019, UnitedMasters artists helped launch the Bose Frames products by featuring the product in their music videos. UnitedMasters helped identify ambassadors for the campaign and Bose assisted in the development and promotion of each artist's music videos.

In a 2019 partnership with iHeartRadio and AT&T, UnitedMasters helped major radio stations including Power 105.1 in New York City and Real 92.3 in Los Angeles celebrate emerging artists in their cities. Through 'The Come Up Show' series, independent artists got the opportunity to submit music for the chance to receive major radio play, $25,000, and a distribution deal through UnitedMasters.

Also in 2019, UnitedMasters announced a partnership with NBA 2K20.

In June 2020, UnitedMasters launched "Cash for Change", a joint venture with mobile payment service Cash App to highlight songs by artists who address political and social issues, predominantly climate change.

In August 2020, UnitedMasters partnered with TikTok to enable music from creators who have joined UnitedMasters to be promoted onto the platform's Commercial Music Library. The partnership was intended to translate trending activity into musical success; several artists who utilize UnitedMasters have found success on the app, such as NLE Choppa and BMW Kenny.

In September 2020, UnitedMasters partnered up with Twitch to feature licensed music for creators. That also includes with CDBaby, Distrokid, and other music distributors.

In March 2021, UnitedMasters raised $50m in a Series B venture round. Funding was led by Apple Inc, with follow-on funding by Google's corporate umbrella Alphabet and Andreessen Horowitz.

In July 2023, UnitedMasters partnered with 1789, a record label owned by Nigerian music producer, Sarz to promote artists and producers across the five regions of Africa.

In April 2024, UnitedMasters partnered with Nine+ Records, a record label owned by American-Nigerian singer and songwriter, Davido to focus on artist development, A&R, and comprehensive support for new signees across various genres, including Afrobeats, hip-hop, R&B, and Latin music.

=== Technology ===
In July 2019, UnitedMasters unveiled its new iOS app which makes the features of the UnitedMasters platform available on mobile devices. The iOS app allows artists to distribute music directly from text messages, Dropbox, or iCloud to streaming platforms including Spotify, Apple, Tidal, and YouTube. Similar to the desktop platform, artists can view streaming stats, playlisting details, financial earnings, and social stats as well as access opportunities for brand partnerships.
