= Kill Bill (song) =

2023 single by SZA

Single by SZA

from the album SOS
- Written: May 2022–July 13, 2022
- Released: January 10, 2023
- Recorded: July 13, 2022
- Studio: Ponzu (Los Angeles); Carter Lang's home studio (Chicago)
- Genre: Pop; R&B; hip hop
- Length: 2:35
- Label: Top Dawg; RCA
- Songwriters: Solána Rowe; Rob Bisel; Carter Lang
- Producers: Rob Bisel; Carter Lang

SZA singles chronology
"Nobody Gets Me" (2023)	"Kill Bill" (2023)	"Special" (remix) (2023)

Music video
- "Kill Bill" on YouTube

Remix cover

Doja Cat singles chronology
"I Like You (A Happier Song)" (2022)	"Kill Bill" (remix) (2023)	"Paint the Town Red" (2023)

Audio
- "Kill Bill" (remix) on YouTube

"Kill Bill" is a song by American singer-songwriter SZA and the fifth single from her second studio album, SOS (2022). It is a pop and R&B murder ballad, built around a midtempo, groovy rhythm and a detuned melody. Guitars, a bassline, and a flute that was sampled from a Prophet-6 synthesizer constitute the song's production, which is influenced by the boom bap subgenre of hip hop. Mirroring the plot of the Kill Bill film duology (2003–2004) after which the song is named, the lyrics discuss a fantasy to kill an ex-boyfriend and his new girlfriend out of jealousy, and they employ humorous irony alongside violent imagery that contrasts with SZA's soft vocals. "Kill Bill" was sent to US radio on January 10, 2023, after achieving success on streaming services.

A chart-topper in several territories, "Kill Bill" was SZA's first number-one on the Billboard Global 200 and US Hot 100 charts. The song spent eight weeks at number two on the Billboard Hot 100 before an April 2023 remix featuring American rapper Doja Cat propelled the solo version to the top, tying for the second-longest time at number two before reaching number one. On US Hot R&B/Hip-Hop Songs, it broke the record set by Lil Nas X's "Old Town Road" (2019) for the chart's longest-running number one at 21 weeks. "Kill Bill" was one of the top 10 best-performing songs of 2023 in several countries, and according to the International Federation of the Phonographic Industry, it was the third best-selling single of 2023. The song has been certified diamond in the US.

"Kill Bill" was praised primarily for its songwriting; critics liked its poetic quality, diaristic honesty, and relatability despite the violent content. The original version and the remix were placed in many year-end listicles for 2023, and in February 2024, Rolling Stone placed "Kill Bill" at number 267 on their list of the 500 greatest songs of all time. The song received many industry award nominations, including three nods for the 66th Annual Grammy Awards. "Kill Bill" won Song of the Year at the 2024 iHeartRadio Music Awards, as well as Top R&B Song at the 2023 Billboard Music Awards and Video of the Year at BET Awards 2023.

A music video for the song premiered the same day as its single release. Directed by Christian Breslauer, it reimagines several scenes from the Kill Bill films, with SZA as her version of the films' protagonist and Vivica A. Fox, one of the actresses who starred in the duology, in a supporting role. SZA confronts her ex-boyfriend at the end and tears his heart out, and the outro features her suspended by a rope using the shibari technique. On the SOS Tour, where she first performed "Kill Bill", she recreated various visual elements from the film duology and the music video, such as the costume. Other live performances also involved sword props and, in some cases, choreography inspired by the Kill Bill films, featuring background dancers who participated in swordfight scenes.

== Background ==
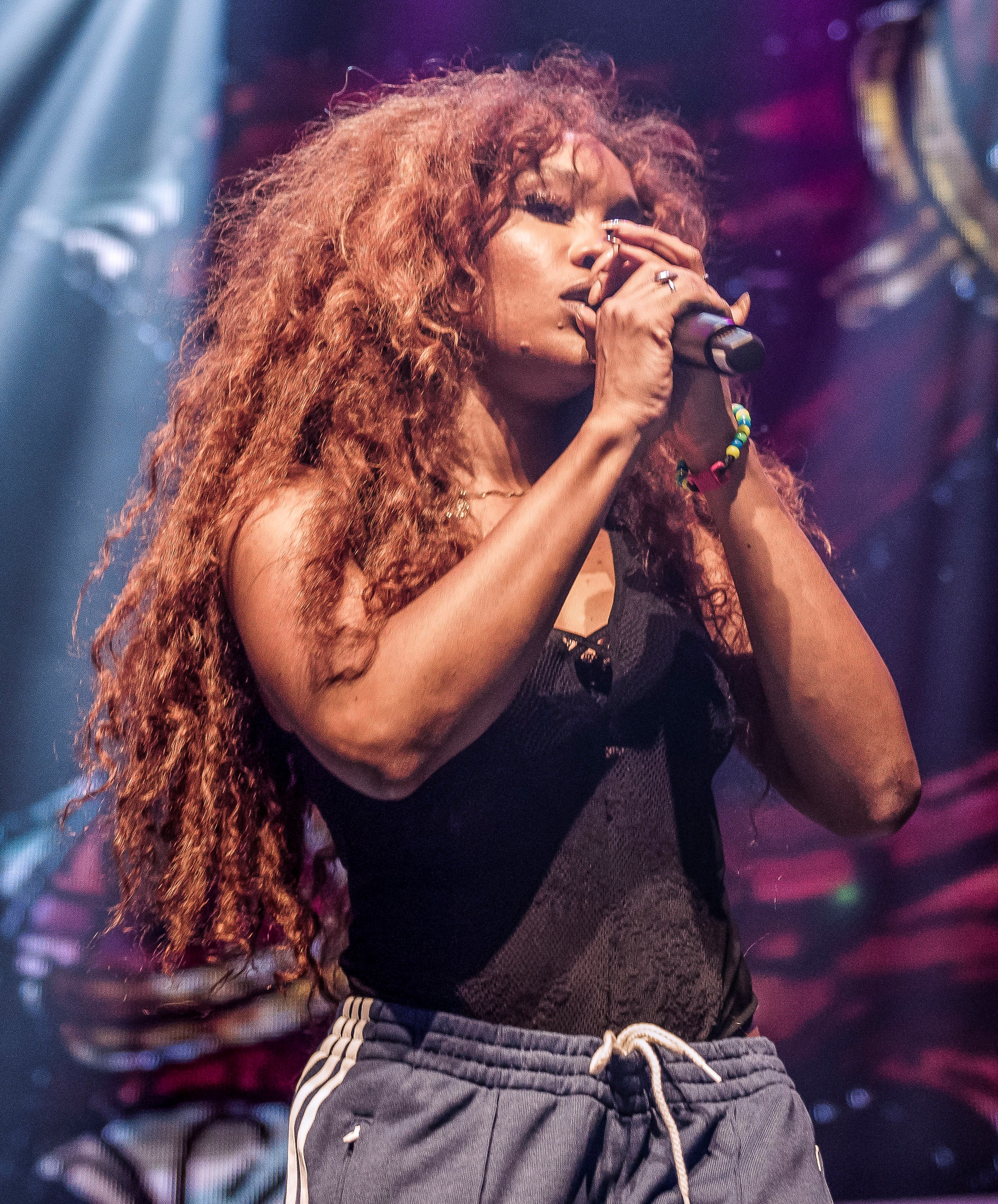
SZA performing in Ctrl the Tour (2017–2018)

In 2017, SZA released her commercially successful and well-acclaimed debut studio album, Ctrl. Critics throughout the years have credited it as being innovative within the R&B genre, and for establishing her as a major figure in contemporary pop and R&B music. (Note: Cited to The Line of Best Fit, NME, The Daily Telegraph, The New Yorker, and Consequence) SZA spoke in Ctrl variously about romance, desire, and self-esteem, often in a vulnerable tone, as well as the many ways in which emotions like jealousy and intense desire can destroy them.

One of the tracks from her subsequent studio album, SOS, is "Kill Bill". It is titled after the Kill Bill films (2003–2004), a martial arts film duology that centers on Beatrix "the Bride" Kiddo and her former lover, the head of a deadly assassin group named Bill. The plot is driven by the Bride's quest for revenge after Bill tried to have her killed on the day of her wedding.

While watching the films, Bill caught SZA's attention and she was inspired to create the song based on his behavior. She described him as a character who "doesn't understand why he did what he did", adding that he was "void of emotion, but he loved the Bride so much that he couldn't stand her to be with anyone else." American Songwriter's Alex Hopper, writing about how the song's lyrics reflected the films' plot, noted that jealousy was Bill's motive for the assassination attempt. In the film's Volume 2, he told the Bride that "[t]here are consequences to breaking the heart of a murdering bastard", which Hopper said was the same justification SZA uses in the song for committing murder.

== Music and recording ==
"Kill Bill"
"Kill Bill" is polyrhythmic, with a midtempo, groovy production that employs boom bap–influenced drum machines, guitars, and a bassline from an electric guitar tuned down an octave. Flute-like sounds from a Prophet-6 synthesizer give it its detuned melody.

"Kill Bill" incorporates prominent, basic eighth notes and is built around a midtempo, groovy rhythm and a detuned melody. The song has a retro, late 1990s–early 2000s sound, influenced by a subgenre of hip hop music called boom bap. Music journalists have described the song as a blend of pop, R&B, and hip hop; some observed elements of associated genres like psychedelic pop, pop-soul, and doo-wop. Will Dukes of Rolling Stone wrote the "eerie chords [exuded] modish late-Sixties cool".

"Kill Bill" was produced by Rob Bisel and Carter Lang, who wrote the song with SZA. Its creation, by SZA's account, was "super easy", and she deemed it a "one take, one night" type of song. (Note: When "Kill Bill" broke her record for highest-charting song in the United States, she was furious that the song that achieved such success was not one that took much effort to make. She said in Billboard: "I knew it would be something that pissed me off. It's always a song that I don't give a fuck about that's just super easy, not the shit that I put so much heart and energy into.") While work on SOS had begun by 2019, "Kill Bill" was recorded in 2022 alongside a significant number of other tracks due to bursts of productivity from time pressure. Lang commented, "that's when [we] started feeling like, hey, 'We gotta do this shit like, it's been some years.' We bottled up that energy and everything was just sort of a preparation for that moment."

Production began around May 2022 when Bisel, in his Los Angeles home's Ponzu Studios, played some chords on his Prophet-6 synthesizer. With it, he used Ableton to sample the synthesizer's flute-like sound. After adding a bassline from an electric guitar tuned down an octave, Bisel was unsure where he wanted the song to go, so he sent the Ableton clip to Lang for assistance. Lang's first approach to the beat consisted of a singular rhythm, which was an electronic fusion of bouncy bass drums, Roland TR-808 snares, and 16th-note hi-hat beats. Settling on a polyrhythmic production with a swing style, he took more beats from a separate, vintage drum machine and made them twice as slow as the first approach, and he added more guitars and bass on top. The two also incorporated a choir and backing vocals into the song. Most of the final version's instruments were recorded at Lang's home studio in Chicago.

Bisel asked Punch, president of SZA's label Top Dawg Entertainment, if he could mix "Kill Bill" on his own, to which Punch agreed. To Bisel, if anyone else took the task, the sonic vision he conjured for the song would get diluted: "I really wanted to see it through all the way to the end." His mentality for the sessions, which consisted of 120 tracks, was mixing the song "as if [he] had never heard the song before", a departure from his usual approach. Since reinforcing the song's boom bap influences was his primary goal, part of the task was making the drums from the rough recordings louder.

"Kill Bill", which was under the working title "Igloo", had five or six different demos from which Bisel and Lang had to pick for SZA. When she listened to the demos one night in July 2022, she immediately gravitated towards the boom bap beat, which Bisel and Lang happened to like the most. About a week later, on July 13, SZA was alone with Bisel in the studio for recording sessions, asking him to loop the beat in the background. He left her alone in a corner to give her space to ideate. It took five to ten minutes for SZA to come up with the hook's melody and lyrics, which she wrote on her phone. Humming the melodies, she turned to Bisel to say about the lyrics, "I have an idea. This might be a little too crazy, but let me know what you think." Within one day, the entire song was finished—SZA needed only one or two takes to record the vocals.

== Lyrics ==
SZA told Glamour in 2022 that many tracks in SOS centered around themes of revenge, heartbreak, and "being pissed": "I've never raged the way that I should have. This is my villain era, and I'm very comfortable with that. It is in the way I say no [...] It's in the fucked up things that I don't apologize for." The premise of "Kill Bill" is heavily based on the Kill Bill films, a reimagining of Thurman's tale of revenge. Shaad D'Souza of The Guardian wrote that unlike the films, however, the song "provides no real emotional payoff; its narrative is a cry of pure fatalism, with no return for its narrator other than a split-second of bloodlust".

"Kill Bill" was written during one of what SZA called "palate cleanser" moments, sessions where she would quickly write full songs in between ones she took more seriously and wanted to meticulously finish. With "Kill Bill", she wrote all of the lyrics on-the-spot in under an hour. What resulted was a song about a protagonist who goes on a quest to avenge her broken heart by murdering her ex-boyfriend for quickly moving on from their relationship. The violent lyrics are juxtaposed by SZA's soft, croon-like vocals, suggesting wholesomeness. Due to the violence, some radio stations played a censored version of "Kill Bill" with the word "kill" replaced by the sound of a slashing blade.

In the first verse, the protagonist acts analogously to Bill, resentful about the new girlfriend that her ex-boyfriend has met: "Hate to see you with some other broad, know you happy / Hate to see you happy if I'm not the one drivin'." Restraining her murderous urges, she tries to look at the situation from a rational perspective. In a Slant Magazine review, Paul Attard writes that SZA explores how intense love and intense anger towards somebody can often coexist with one another. In spite of her fury, her love for her ex-boyfriend persists. She tries to navigate her issues through consultations with a therapist, making her dryly say she is mature and mockingly congratulate herself for it.

Her therapist has advised her to seek other men, but she loves her ex-boyfriend to such a degree that she would rather still be with him than with anyone else. According to her, if she cannot have him back, then "no one should". What follows is the hook, in which she openly fantasizes about killing him and his new girlfriend. She acknowledges, self-aware, that her intrusive thoughts are unhealthy and wonders "how'd I get here?" Some critics argued that SZA amplifies the hook's unsettling nature and criminal themes using melodies evocative of lullabies. For Philippine Daily Inquirer journalist Carl Martin Agustin, the hook conjures the imagery of "the bride preparing her mark for his eternal slumber". Thurman's character manifests itself within SZA in the hook, moving the perspective away from Bill's. Despite hesitations, she begins her plans for revenge. SZA ends the hook with the line "Rather be in jail than alone."

The song's next lyrics narrate how she carefully peruses past messages with her ex-boyfriend that might implicate her in the murder. The final hook contains several line changes that mark the culmination of the violent ideations that manifested in the first hook. SZA enacts the double homicide, solidifying the song's nature as a murder ballad. Reasoning with herself, she claims what she did to her ex-boyfriend was an act of love and is not something that she regrets doing. Music journalists from Triple J and Pitchfork found this humorous; Pitchfork's Julianne Escobedo Shepherd wrote: "It's so funny to imagine killing someone and his new girl and then have a fleeting second thought about it. Like, 'Maybe I shouldn't have done that. Oh well!'"

The last lyric of the final hook, and the last lyric of the song, contrasts with the first hook. "I might kill my ex, not the best idea / His new girlfriend's next," becomes "I just killed my ex, not the best idea / Killed his girlfriend next." This final lyric shows her admission she would pick damnation in hell over his absence from her life. The "Rather be in jail than alone" from the previous hooks becomes "Rather be in hell than alone." Some critics wrote that the last line unveiled the song's underlying tones of loneliness and turned "Kill Bill" into a tragedy. In Nylon, Steffanee Wang thought it "will make you wonder how SZA can generate such devastation from such simplicity".

== Release ==
=== Original ===
From April to May 2022, SZA told media outlets that she had recently finished the album in Hawaii and said it was coming soon. During a Billboard cover story published in November, SZA revealed the album title and release date, which was scheduled sometime next month. On December 5, 2022, she posted the album's track list on Twitter, and SOS was released four days later. Out of 23 songs, "Kill Bill" appears as the second track; following its success on streaming platforms, RCA Records chose it as the next radio single from the album.

RCA and Top Dawg sent the song to US pop, rhythmic, and urban radio on January 10, 2023, as the fifth single from SOS. (Note: Following "Good Days", "I Hate U", "Shirt", and "Nobody Gets Me") Originally, only "Nobody Gets Me" (2023) was scheduled to impact pop radio on January 10. However, RCA and various radio programmers eventually decided to promote the two songs simultaneously despite the intricacies of planning dual singles, citing the large streaming numbers that "Kill Bill" gained in December and the radio-friendly appeal of the lyrics and production. "Kill Bill" became one of the week's most-added songs on pop and rhythmic formats, with 2,257 plays from 129 pop radio stations. Top Dawg and RCA pushed it to R&B radio stations three weeks later.

On January 13, 2023, Top Dawg and RCA released a four-track bundle of the song to digital download and streaming platforms. Apart from the original version of "Kill Bill", the release contains a sped-up version, an instrumental version, and an a cappella version. An acoustic version of the song, with a different cover art, was released on January 24. The sped-up version capitalizes and is based on a viral trend on TikTok where users would increase the pitch and tempo of certain songs and post them on the application. One user shared a sped-up audio of "Kill Bill" upon the release of SOS, and it was viewed over 21.7 million times, liked over 1.9 million times, and reposted in over 1.1 million videos, boosting streams for the song.

=== Remix ===
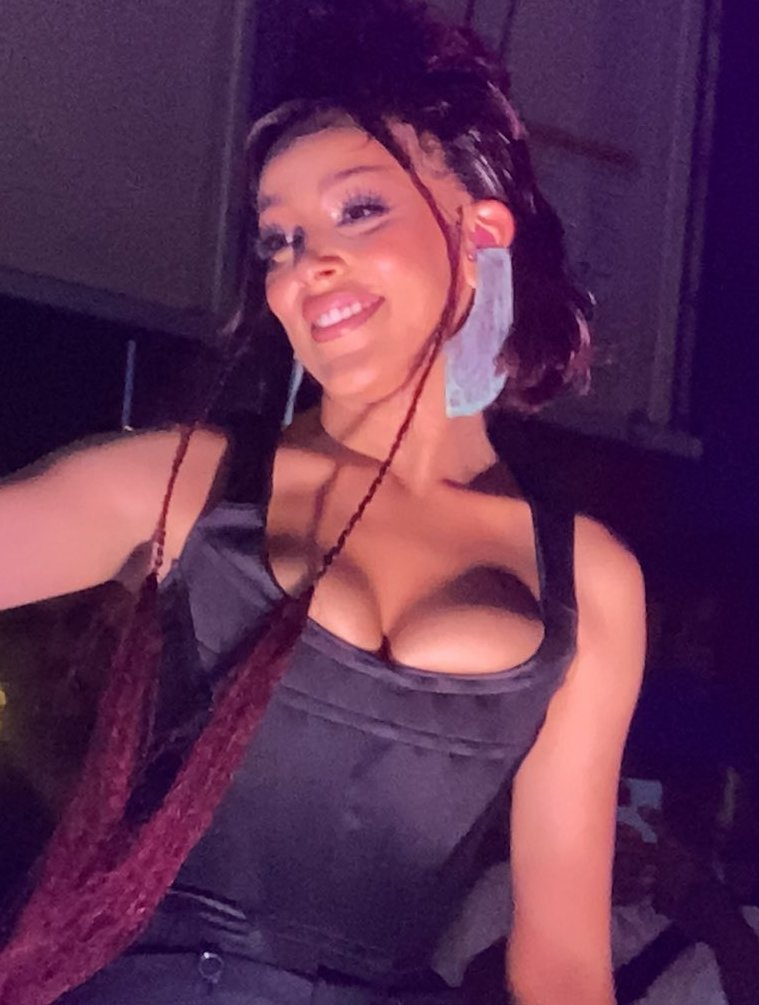
Doja Cat featured on the official remix for "Kill Bill", their second collaboration after "Kiss Me More".

In 2021, SZA collaborated with American rapper Doja Cat for the song "Kiss Me More", serving as the lead single from the latter's third studio album, Planet Her (2021). Their next collaboration was set to be "Shirt", SOS's third single. Three months after SZA teased "Shirt" was a collaboration, Punch told Complex that Doja Cat was to feature not on the song's original version, but on a remix instead. Because of an emergency vocal surgery that Doja Cat underwent, the remix's release did not happen. SZA reacted in disappointment, and she hoped that she can work with her again on other projects.

On April 14, 2023, Doja Cat hinted at another collaboration with SZA on Instagram, tagging her on a post that read "9 pm." On Twitter, the two had a public, back-and-forth interaction. Doja Cat told SZA "sis... I did something bad", to which SZA responded "Jesus.. What is it." A remix of "Kill Bill", featuring Doja Cat, was surprise-released at the indicated time, with a rap verse that opens the song and continues the storyline of the original version. An animated video accompanying the remix was posted to YouTube, showing a pixelated Doja Cat as she uses a ball and chain to fight enemies.

== Commercial performance ==
"Kill Bill" saw massive commercial success, buoyed strongly by its streaming numbers. According to the International Federation of the Phonographic Industry, it was the third best-selling single of 2023, earning 1.84 billion units based on streams and digital sales, and it was Spotify's second most-streamed song of 2023. It spent two weeks atop the Billboard Global 200 chart, which tracks songs' performance on streaming and download platforms, and four weeks atop US Streaming Songs. It was SZA's first song to top the Billboard Global 200, and it did so in early January 2023, bolstered by around 64 million international streams. The week prior, it debuted atop Streaming Songs with 36.9 million US streams for the December 24, 2022, issue. It was her first number-one there and the first non-holiday song since 2018 to be the top entry on the chart for the week of Christmas.

With "Kill Bill" and "Nobody Gets Me", SZA acquired her sixth and seventh top 10 songs in the United States. Meanwhile, in Canada, "Kill Bill" debuted at number 5 and later peaked at number 3. SZA achieved her highest debut on the US Billboard Hot 100 when the song entered the chart as an album track in December 2022, at number three. Once it was sent to radio, "Kill Bill" became SZA's first top 10 entry on the Radio Songs chart, where it reached number two. It was her third and fastest song to top Rhythmic Airplay, the first radio chart "Kill Bill" topped, and her first in a lead credit to top Pop Airplay.

The song spent 17 of its first 18 weeks on the Billboard Hot 100 in the top 10. Of those 18 weeks, 8 were spent at number two. Three songs kept "Kill Bill" from the top spot: "Anti-Hero" (2022) by Taylor Swift, "Flowers" (2023) by Miley Cyrus, and "Last Night" (2023) by Morgan Wallen. After 8 weeks at number two, "Kill Bill" topped the Billboard Hot 100, becoming SZA's first number-one in the United States, boosted by the remix. It tied with three other songs for the second-most weeks at number two before reaching the top, behind "Bad Guy" (2019) by Billie Eilish (9 weeks). On US Hot R&B/Hip-Hop Songs, "Kill Bill" was SZA's second number-one debut, after "I Hate U" in 2021, and was at number one for 21 weeks. It broke the record for the longest time a song spent atop the chart, surpassing Lil Nas X's "Old Town Road" (2019). "Kill Bill" ended 2023 as the third best-performing song in the US, and it has been certified diamond by the Recording Industry Association of America for selling 10,000,000 equivalent units.

The song peaked within the top 5 of the Middle East and North Africa (MENA) region, and it had more several top 5 peaks in the Asia-Pacific. "Kill Bill" spent multiple weeks at number one in New Zealand and Singapore, and it was the highest-charting international song in Malaysia for over a week. It also went number one in Indonesia and the Philippines, and it reached number 4 and number 3 in Vietnam and the MENA's regional chart, respectively. "Kill Bill" was SZA's first chart-topping song in Australia, where it was certified 7× platinum for selling over 490,000 equivalent units, and was the country's third-biggest song of 2023. It received a 6× platinum certification in New Zealand for selling over 180,000 units.

On the UK Singles Chart, "Kill Bill" debuted within the top 15 in mid–December 2022. It rose to the top 10, SZA's first solo song to do so, in early 2023, once Christmas songs had left the chart. Peaking at number 3, "Kill Bill" tied "Kiss Me More" as her highest-charting song in the UK; ended the year with over 100 million streams and 1,069,727 total sales; and was the country's seventh best-performing song. Elsewhere in Europe, it reached the top 20 in Ireland, the Nordic countries, Lithuania, Portugal, Slovakia, Switzerland, Hungary, the Netherlands, Germany, and Austria and top forty in the Netherlands, France and Belgium. (Note: See the charts section for the exact peaks.)

== Critical reception ==
=== Reviews ===
"Kill Bill" was highly lauded by music critics. Many of them called "Kill Bill" a highlight of SOS, (Note: Cited to multiple reviews) and Sophie Williams of NME attributed the choice to its vivid, detail-heavy storytelling. Compliments toward the lyrics revolved around its cinematic narrative, poetic quality, and raw honesty. Some praised it for demonstrating SZA's lyrical versatility, capable of not only relishing in sadness but also expressing anger. Meanwhile, Vulture's Zoe Guy, Pitchfork's Jill Mapes, and Rolling Stone's Mankaprr Conteh lauded "Kill Bill" as an exemplar of how to blend pop-culture references with internal struggles and candid self-reflection to create a lyrically memorable song. Other critics pointed towards the lyrics' melodrama and relatability despite the extreme violence, and Billboard writers cited these qualities as the reason for the song's critical and commercial success: "people just love violence, and seem to have a weird fascination with 'crazy in love' relationship dynamics."

Some critics praised "Kill Bill" for its novel approach to revenge songs, such as Giselle Au-Nhien Nguyen of The Sydney Morning Herald, who wrote that SZA provided a refreshing and "intoxicating" take to very common tropes associated with murder ballads. Referencing the break-up songs that blocked the song from number one, "Flowers" and "Last Night", D'Souza argued that "Kill Bill" was a standout among its commercially successful contemporaries that, in his view, had more boilerplate and "easily digestible" lyrics about heartbreak. He continued that "SZA's success feels like a win for a kind of pop music that's in short supply right now."

Music journalists commended the song for its catchiness. Lyndsey Havens for Billboard said that "Kill Bill" was good for singalongs, and in The Atlantic, Spencer Kornhaber wrote: "As if her evil genius was in doubt, [it] will have millions of people doing their holiday shopping with a serial-killer confession stuck in their head." Other critics praised her vocals, writing that its softness elevated the song's vulnerability and intimacy, and its production, with two describing its melody as smooth as water.

=== Rankings ===
The original version appeared in best-of-2023 song listicles published on USA Today (unranked) and Pitchfork (6), and it was placed at number one by Heran Mamo on Billboard's. Year-end rankings that featured the remix included ones published by Rolling Stone (16) and BBC News (6).

"Kill Bill" placed at number 267 at the February 2024 iteration of Rolling Stone's 500 Greatest Songs of All Time list, which wrote that it was "the epitome of what makes [SZA] one of this generation's greatest songwriters". Billboard ranked the song as the 222nd best pop song of all time in October 2023, as well as the 4th best breakup song of all time in February 2024. On their 2023 listicle, the magazine wrote that "Kill Bill" marked SZA's "official crossover from subversive R&B tastemaker to bona fide pop star". In a 2025 ranking of SZA's discography, The Guardian critic Alexis Petridis rated "Kill Bill" as her second-best song. He praised "how engagingly witty its fantasies of offing an ex [were]", also writing positively about the chorus's "pure pop sweetness".

== Accolades ==
List of awards and nominations received by "Kill Bill"
Year	Award	Category	Result	Ref.
2023	BET Awards	Video of the Year	Won	
2023	BET Awards	Viewer's Choice Award	Nominated	
2023	MTV Video Music Awards	Video of the Year	Nominated	
2023	MTV Video Music Awards	Song of the Year	Nominated	
2023	MTV Video Music Awards	Best Direction	Nominated	
2023	MTV Video Music Awards	Best Editing	Nominated	
2023	MTV Video Music Awards	Song of Summer	Nominated	
2023	MTV Europe Music Awards	Best Song	Nominated	
2023	MTV Europe Music Awards	Best Video	Nominated	
2023	UK Music Video Awards	Best R&B/Soul Video – International	Nominated	
2023	Billboard Music Awards	Top Hot 100 Song	Nominated	
2023	Billboard Music Awards	Top Streaming Song	Nominated	
2023	Billboard Music Awards	Top Billboard Global 200 Song	Nominated	
2023	Billboard Music Awards	Top R&B Song	Won	
2023	Soul Train Music Awards	Song of the Year	Nominated	
2023	Soul Train Music Awards	Video of the Year	Nominated	
2023	Soul Train Music Awards	The Ashford and Simpson Songwriter's Award	Nominated	
2024	Grammy Awards	Record of the Year	Nominated	
2024	Grammy Awards	Song of the Year	Nominated	
2024	Grammy Awards	Best R&B Performance	Nominated	
2024	Brit Awards	Best International Song	Nominated	
2024	iHeartRadio Music Awards	Song of the Year	Won	
2024	iHeartRadio Music Awards	Pop Song of the Year	Nominated	
2024	iHeartRadio Music Awards	Best Music Video	Nominated	
2024	BMI Pop Awards	Most Performed Songs of the Year	Won	
2024	BMI R&B/Hip-Hop Awards	Most Performed Songs of the Year	Won	
2024	BMI R&B/Hip-Hop Awards	Song of the Year	Won	

== Music video ==
=== Background ===
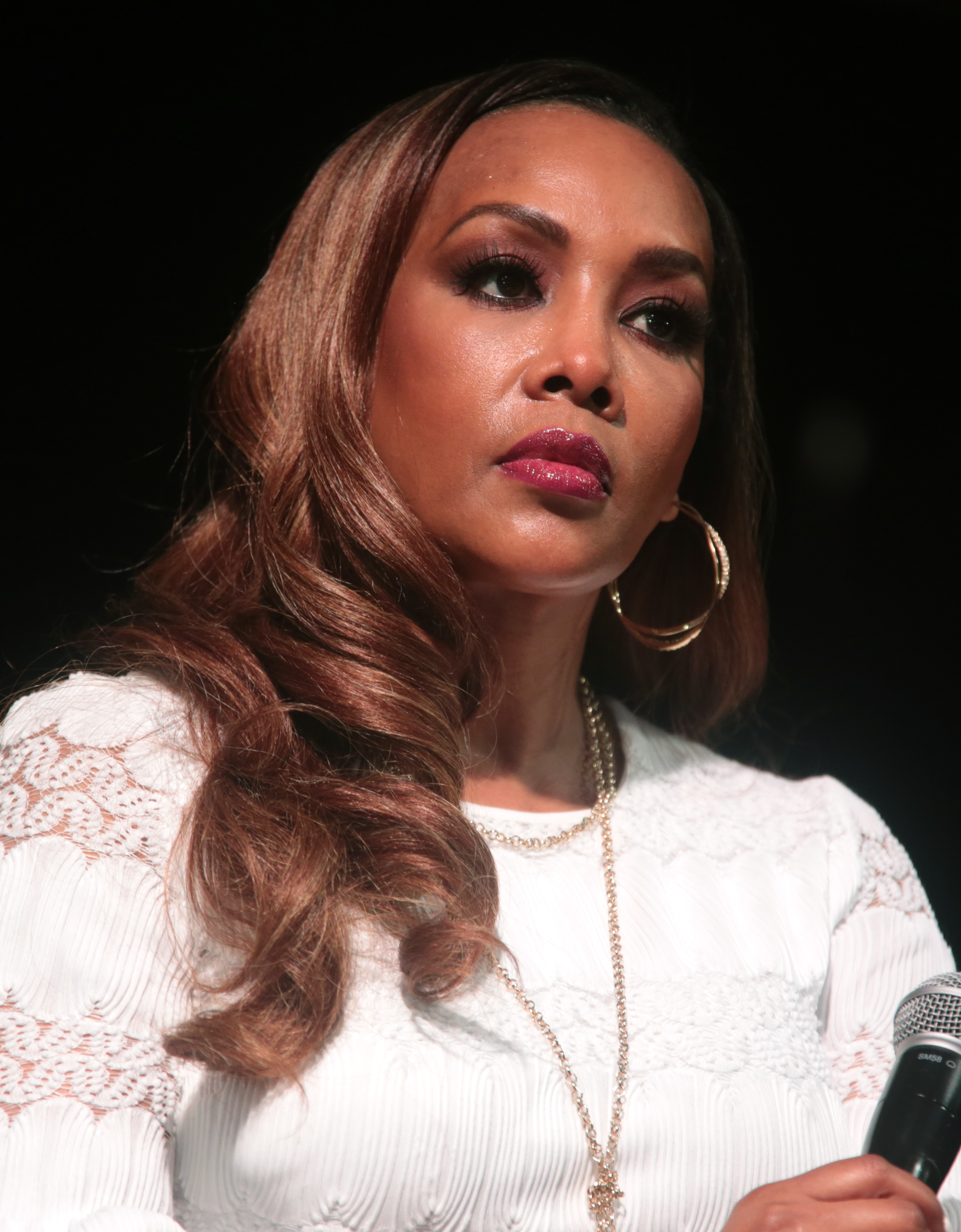
Vivica A. Fox, one of the starring actresses in the Kill Bill films, makes a cameo in the music video.

SZA expressed her gratitude for fans' warm reception of "Kill Bill" by posting a 20-second teaser of the music video to Twitter on December 29, 2022, having alluded to its creation around a week prior during an interview with Entertainment Weekly. The video was directed by Christian Breslauer and produced by Luga Podesta through his production company London Alley Entertainment. It premiered on YouTube the same day as the song's release, briefly going private after its first 10 minutes of availability before being made public again.

With the video, SZA aimed to create something more narrative-centric compared to her past music videos which, while containing a few story beats, did not have full, coherent plotlines. In Breslauer's words, she wanted "less performance and [more] acting"; the result was a short action film heavily inspired by the Kill Bill duology. The music video recreates several scenes and plot points from the films, with SZA appearing as a recreation of the Bride. She appears in a red and black jumpsuit similar to the Bride's yellow and black one, and she uses a katana as her fighting weapon. Vivica A. Fox, the actress who starred in Kill Bill as a Deadly Viper and the Bride's enemy Vernita Green, makes a cameo in the video. Her scenes were the last ones filmed during production; prior to Fox, the casting crew considered Uma Thurman, the actress for the Bride, for the cameo role.

Pre-production began in the middle of December 2022, when Top Dawg approached London Alley to produce the video, and principal photography took place six days later. The scheduled period for filming was one day before the company's Christmas break, so all scenes had to be completed within 19 or 20 hours, in contrast to the usual two or three days allocated for similar music videos. The video is a blend of visual techniques from several film genres. For example, it contains an anime-style interlude that was added in post-production, and it incorporates many split-screen shots, a choice inspired by the cinematography of several 1970s films. Regarding this, Breslauer said: "Tarantino is the ultimate chop and screw hybrid filmmaker in how he grabs from so many films and genres, so wanted to do a little of that here as well."

SZA had prominent authority in the creative direction; for example, she performed most of her stunts despite little time to choreograph, learning them in less than four hours. She had been promoting specific tracks from SOS by using the outros of her music videos to tease an upcoming song, (Note: It began with the inclusion of a snippet of "Good Days" (2020), SOS's lead single, at the end of the video for standalone single "Hit Different" (2020). "Shirt" (2022), the album's third single, was teased at the outro for the "Good Days" music video; the "Shirt" video itself features a teaser of the album track "Blind" (2022).) and she wanted to continue the trend with the "Kill Bill" video. Her choice for the outro song was the album track "Seek & Destroy". It contains the line "I had to do it to you", which she deemed fitting because when applied in the context of "Kill Bill", the lyrics captured SZA's celebration of revenge and the glory it brought her. For the video's outro, she asked someone with expertise in shibari to tie her upside down. Due to the violence and gore scenes, several angles of the video were blurred and the clip was broadcast with a warning "-10" (for Not advised to kids under 10 years old) on a few music channels in France.

=== Plot ===
The opening scene, set to "Nobody Gets Me", contains the first out of many Kill Bill references, set in a trailer reminiscent of the one in which Budd, another of Thurman's sworn enemies, resided. During this, the boyfriend breaks up with SZA and leaves her in the trailer before he tells his gunmen, who act as the video's Deadly Vipers, to shoot her dead while she is inside. She survives the assault and gets in a car driven by Fox's character, who takes her to a warehouse where she prepares to enact vengeance on the hitmen. SZA dresses up in the jumpsuit, gets a katana which she uses to decapitate a dummy, and drives on a motorcycle to find her ex-boyfriend.

SZA arrives at a location analogous to the films' House of Blue Leaves, a Japanese bar that served as the headquarters for O-Ren Ishii, a high-ranking assassin of the Deadly Vipers. In there, she confronts several yakuza bodyguards who represent Ishii's Crazy 88, kill them one by one, and enter a room to face her ex-boyfriend. The confrontation scene, the anime-style interlude, alludes to the animated sequence that introduced Ishii's backstory in Volume 1. The video ends as SZA approaches the man, rips his heart out, and licks it, fulfilling her revenge. A naked and tied-up SZA, hung upside down from the warehouse ceiling, appears in the outro while a snippet of "Seek & Destroy" plays.

== Live performances ==
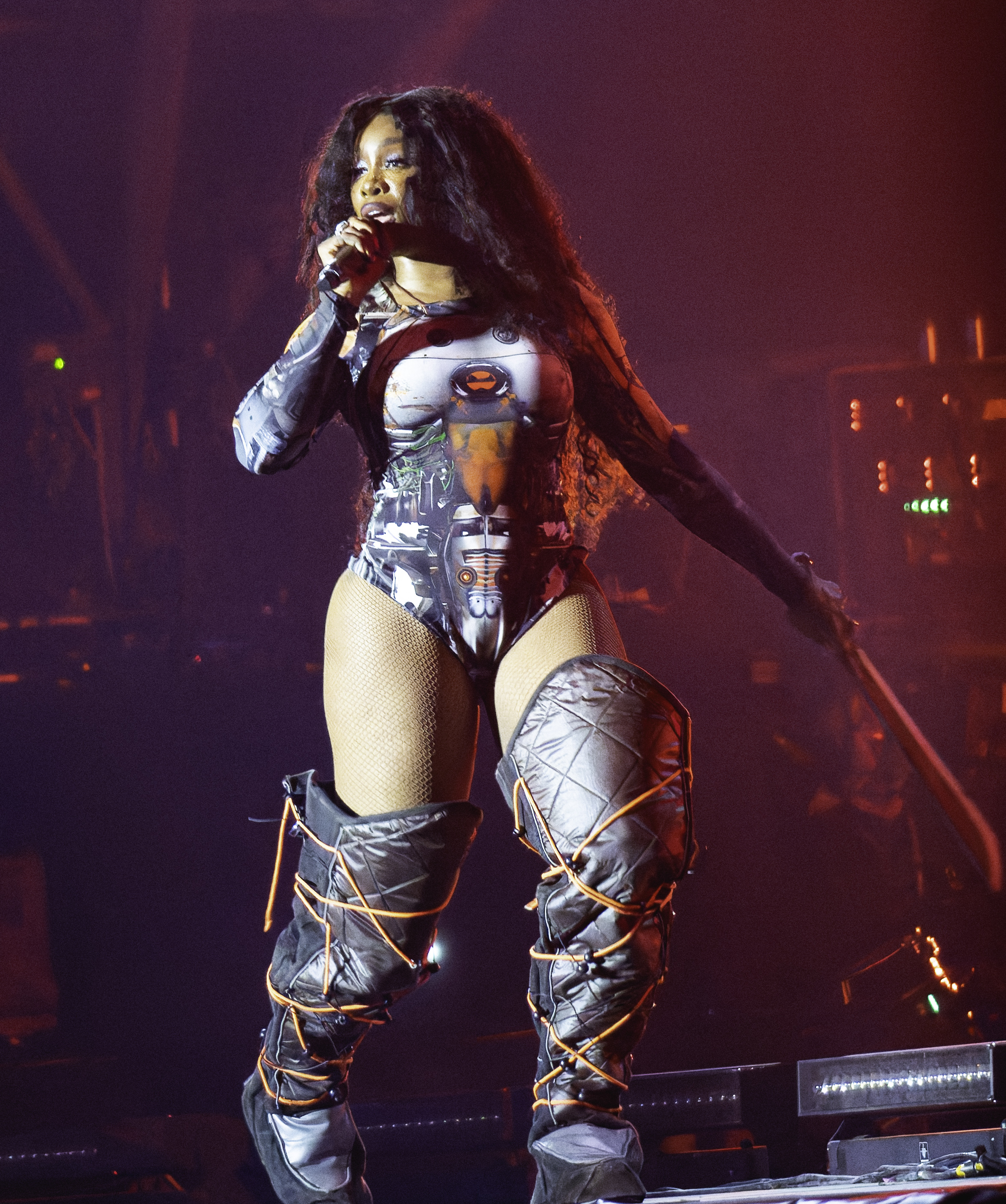
SZA performing "Kill Bill" during Glastonbury 2024

SZA first performed "Kill Bill" live on the SOS Tour, during a concert in Columbus, Ohio. It took place at the Schottenstein Center on February 21, 2023. A live performance at one of the New York City shows was released as part of a video series on Apple TV+ covering the tour. When the tour's concerts neared their end, she would change her outfit to wear red biker pants and a motor suit, similar to her look for the music video. Recreating the Crazy 88 sequence, SZA had a spiked ball and chain in one of her hands that she swung across the stage. Her prop was a callback to the fight scene in Volume 1 between Thurman and one of Ishii's fighters—the fighter in question was Gogo Yubari, who armed herself with a meteor hammer, a weapon consisting of a chain and a weight attached to both ends.

At the 2023 iHeartRadio Jingle Ball, held in early December, SZA included "Kill Bill" as part of her headlining set. She, along with a group of backup dancers, brandished machetes on stage to complement the lyrics. Before she performed the song at the 66th Annual Grammy Awards in February 2024, the broadcast showed a woman in the audience who was standing on a table and swinging a sword. The woman joined SZA and other dancers with swords for the performance. It centered around a fighting sequence, which featured one man whom SZA threw across the stage and another man whom she pushed to the floor as red fabric fell towards her. The song's performance during the Grand National Tour (2025) was accompanied by footage of praying mantises mating, which ends with the female killing the male and eating his head.

== Credits ==
Adapted from Sound on Sound and the liner notes of SOS

Recording and management

- Instruments recorded at Ponzu Studios (Los Angeles) and Carter Lang's home studio
- Engineered at Westlake Barn and Studios A and D (Los Angeles, California)
- Mixed at Ponzu
- Mastered at Becker Mastering (Pasadena, California)

Personnel

- Solána Rowe (SZA) – vocals, songwriting
- Rob Bisel – songwriting, production, guitars, bass, Mellotron, (Note: Mellotron's sounds came from Prophet-6 synthesizer) choir, engineering, mixing
- Carter Lang – songwriting, production, guitars, bass, drums, choir
- Syd Tagle – assistant engineering
- Robert N. Johnson – assistant engineering
- Trey Pearce – assistant engineering
- Dale Becker – mastering
- Katie Harvey – assistant mastering
- Noah McCorkle – assistant mastering

== Charts ==
=== Weekly charts ===
Weekly chart performance
Chart (2022–2025)	Peak position
Australia (ARIA)	1
Australia Hip Hop/R&B (ARIA)	1
Austria (Ö3 Austria Top 40)	19
Belgium (Ultratop 50 Flanders)	40
Belgium (Ultratop 50 Wallonia)	50
Canada Hot 100 (Billboard)	3
Canada CHR/Top 40 (Billboard)	3
Canada Hot AC (Billboard)	32
Croatia (Billboard)	22
Czech Republic Airplay (ČNS IFPI)	49
Czech Republic Singles Digital (ČNS IFPI)	23
Denmark (Tracklisten)	7
Finland (Suomen virallinen lista)	16
France (SNEP)	34
Germany (GfK)	17
Global 200 (Billboard)	1
Greece International (IFPI)	5
Hong Kong (Billboard)	22
Hungary (Rádiós Top 40)	40
Hungary (Single Top 40)	22
Hungary (Stream Top 40)	15
Iceland (Tónlistinn)	4
India International (IMI)	12
Indonesia (Billboard)	1
Ireland (IRMA)	3
Israel International Airplay (Media Forest)	12
Italy (FIMI)	78
Japan Hot Overseas (Billboard Japan)	4
Latvia (LaIPA)	4
Lithuania (AGATA)	2
Luxembourg (Billboard)	9
Malaysia (Billboard)	1
Malaysia International (RIM)	1
MENA (IFPI)	3
Netherlands (Dutch Top 40)	28
Netherlands (Single Top 100)	15
New Zealand (Recorded Music NZ)	1
Nigeria (TurnTable Top 100)	54
Norway (VG-lista)	5
Philippines (Billboard)	1
Philippines (Philippines Hot 100)	49
Poland (Polish Streaming Top 100)	23
Portugal (AFP)	5
Singapore (RIAS)	1
Slovakia Singles Digital (ČNS IFPI)	10
South Africa (Billboard)	8
South Korea (Circle)	96
Spain (Promusicae)	80
Suriname (Nationale Top 40)	19
Sweden (Sverigetopplistan)	5
Switzerland (Schweizer Hitparade)	12
Turkey International Airplay (Radiomonitor Türkiye)	2
UK Singles (Official Charts)	3
UK Hip Hop/R&B (Official Charts)	1
US Billboard Hot 100	1
US Adult Contemporary (Billboard)	30
US Adult Pop Airplay (Billboard)	7
US Dance Airplay (Billboard)	14
US Hot R&B/Hip-Hop Songs (Billboard)	1
US Pop Airplay (Billboard)	1
US Rhythmic Airplay (Billboard)	1
US R&B/Hip-Hop Airplay (Billboard)	3
Vietnam (Vietnam Hot 100)	4

=== Monthly charts ===
Monthly chart performance
Chart (2023)	Peak position
South Korea (Circle)	129

=== Year-end charts ===
Year-end chart performance
Chart (2023)	Position
Australia (ARIA)	3
Austria (Ö3 Austria Top 40)	73
Belgium (Ultratop Flanders)	97
Brazil Streaming (Pro-Música Brasil)	156
Canada (Canadian Hot 100)	6
Denmark (Tracklisten)	35
France (SNEP)	105
Germany (Official German Charts)	82
Global 200 (Billboard)	3
Global Singles (IFPI)	3
Netherlands (Single Top 100)	33
New Zealand (Recorded Music NZ)	2
Philippines (Billboard)	2
Poland (Polish Streaming Top 100)	86
Sweden (Sverigetopplistan)	34
Switzerland (Schweizer Hitparade)	43
UK Singles (OCC)	7
US Billboard Hot 100	3
US Adult Top 40 (Billboard)	30
US Dance/Mix Show Airplay (Billboard)	43
US Hot R&B/Hip-Hop Songs (Billboard)	1
US Mainstream Top 40 (Billboard)	6
US Rhythmic (Billboard)	3
US R&B/Hip-Hop Airplay (Billboard)	15

Year-end chart performance
Chart (2024)	Position
Australia (ARIA)	69
Australia Hip Hop/R&B (ARIA)	10
Global 200 (Billboard)	47
New Zealand (Recorded Music NZ)	46
Philippines (Philippines Hot 100)	56
Portugal (AFP)	188

Year-end chart performance
Chart (2025)	Position
Global 200 (Billboard)	186

== Certifications ==
Certifications
Region	Certification	Certified units/sales
Australia (ARIA)	7× Platinum	490,000^{‡}
Austria (IFPI Austria)	Platinum	30,000^{‡}
Belgium (BRMA)	Platinum	40,000^{‡}
Brazil (Pro-Música Brasil)	2× Diamond	320,000^{‡}
Canada (Music Canada)	Diamond	800,000^{‡}
Denmark (IFPI Danmark)	Platinum	90,000^{‡}
France (SNEP)	Diamond	333,333^{‡}
Germany (BVMI)	Gold	300,000^{‡}
Hungary (MAHASZ)	2× Platinum	8,000^{‡}
Italy (FIMI)	Platinum	100,000^{‡}
Mexico (AMPROFON)	2× Platinum+Gold	350,000^{‡}
New Zealand (RMNZ)	6× Platinum	180,000^{‡}
Poland (ZPAV)	Platinum	50,000^{‡}
Portugal (AFP)	3× Platinum	30,000^{‡}
Spain (Promusicae)	Platinum	60,000^{‡}
Switzerland (IFPI Switzerland)	Platinum	20,000^{‡}
United Kingdom (BPI)	3× Platinum	1,800,000^{‡}
United States (RIAA)	Diamond	10,000,000^{‡}
Streaming
Greece (IFPI Greece)	2× Platinum	4,000,000^{†}
Sweden (GLF)	Platinum	8,000,000^{†}
^{‡} Sales+streaming figures based on certification alone.^{†} Streaming-only figures based on certification alone.

== Release history ==
Release history and formats for "Kill Bill"
Region	Date	Format	Version	Label(s)	Ref.
United States	January 10, 2023	Contemporary hit radio	Original	Top Dawg; RCA	
United States	January 10, 2023	Rhythmic contemporary radio	Original	Top Dawg; RCA	
United States	January 10, 2023	Urban contemporary radio	Original	Top Dawg; RCA	
Various	January 13, 2023	Digital download; streaming	Four-track single	Top Dawg; RCA	
Various	January 24, 2023	Digital download; streaming	Acoustic	Top Dawg; RCA	
United States	January 31, 2023	Urban adult contemporary radio	Original	Top Dawg; RCA	
Italy	February 3, 2023	Radio airplay	Original	Sony Italy	
Various	April 14, 2023	Digital download; streaming	Doja Cat remix	Top Dawg; RCA	
Italy	April 14, 2023	Radio airplay	Doja Cat remix	Sony Italy	

== See also ==
- List of best-selling singles
- List of most-streamed songs on Spotify
- List of Billboard Hot 100 number ones of 2023
- List of Billboard Global 200 number ones of 2023
- List of Billboard Streaming Songs number ones of 2022
- List of Billboard Streaming Songs number ones of 2023
- List of Billboard Hot 100 top-ten singles in 2022
- List of Billboard Hot 100 top-ten singles in 2023
- Most weeks at number one on Hot R&B/Hip-hop songs chart
- List of number-one R&B/hip-hop songs of 2022 (U.S.)
- List of number-one R&B/hip-hop songs of 2023 (U.S.)
- List of number-one singles of 2023 (Australia)
- List of number-one singles from the 2020s (New Zealand)
- List of number-one songs of 2022 (Singapore)
- List of UK top-ten singles in 2023
