= Blind (SZA song) =

Song by SZA

from the album SOS
- Written: 2022
- Released: December 9, 2022
- Recorded: 2022
- Genre: R&B; folk-pop
- Length: 2:30
- Label: Top Dawg; RCA
- Songwriters: Solána Rowe; Rob Bisel; Carter Lang; Margaux Alexis Rosalena Whitney; Will Miller
- Producers: Rob Bisel; Carter Lang; Yuli; Will Miller

Lyric video
- "Blind" on YouTube

"Blind" is a song by American singer-songwriter SZA from her second studio album, SOS (2022). It is a beatless R&B and folk-pop song, featuring an orchestral production that consists of acoustic guitars, violas, and trumpets. SZA's vocal performance combines a rap cadence and slow falsetto vocals, with added vocal runs. In the song, SZA explores the duality of love and muses on a former relationship, as she expresses her disappointment to a toxic past partner while also expressing her continued attraction to him. For the chorus, SZA admits her insecurities in spite of seeking validation through sex, feeling empty and unable to find self-love within herself as a result of a failed romance. "Blind" also incorporates several pop culture references to figures such as Bob Saget and Jesus.

Critics complimented "Blind" for its humor, orchestral production, and wordplay; some called it an album standout. The song's honest, personal songwriting was a main point of commentary, with praise for its portrayal of love's contradictory nature. "Blind" debuted at number 3 on US Hot R&B/Hip-Hop Songs, where it and two other SOS tracks occupied the top 3, and was a top-40 song in a few countries. On the Billboard Hot 100, "Blind" peaked at number 12. The song was included regularly on set lists of the SOS Tour and debuted live on the late-night show Saturday Night Live, days prior to the album's release. Weeks beforehand, a snippet of "Blind" appeared at the end of the music video for the SOS single "Shirt", which continued a trend set by SZA where she would tease unreleased music at the end of videos.

== Background ==
SZA rose to mainstream fame upon the 2017 release of her debut studio album, Ctrl. It received widespread acclaim from critics, and many have credited it with establishing her status as a prominent figure in contemporary pop and R&B music and pushing the boundaries of the R&B genre. (Note: Cited to Vulture, The Recording Academy, The Line of Best Fit, NME, The Daily Telegraph, The New Yorker, and Consequence.) After Ctrl's release, SZA began appearing in soundtracks and collaborations with several musicians, which fueled media speculation on when her next studio album would be released. Speculation heightened in 2020 when she released "Hit Different" and "Good Days", her first work as a solo artist in five years.

As early as August 2019, SZA alluded to the album's completion, specifically during an interview with DJ Kerwin Frost. When SZA collaborated with Cosmopolitan for their February 2021 issue, she spoke about her creative process behind the album's conception: "this album is going to be the shit that made me feel something in my...here and in here", pointing to her heart and gut.

SZA attached a snippet of "Good Days" at the end of the music video for "Hit Different", and forthcoming videos would feature the same creative decision; SZA explained: "I always drop something that juxtaposes the song that's attached to it." Teased at the end of the "Good Days" music video was "Shirt", released as a single on October 28, 2022, and the outro of the latter's video featured a song fans began calling "Blind". Both songs had their live debuts on December 3, during the seventh episode of Saturday Night Live's forty-eighth season. Two days later, SZA shared a teaser for the album, titled SOS, that was soundtracked to "Blind".

== Music and production ==
"Blind"
A beatless, acoustic R&B and folk pop song, "Blind" blends falsetto vocals and vocal runs with guitars and violas. SZA performs with a rap cadence in parts of the song.

"Blind" is an R&B and folk-pop ballad. It is a beatless song, backed only by an acoustic guitar and a viola; the strings are played using the pizzicato technique. The song also features trumpets, which, along with the guitar strings, come from a synthesizer. SZA raps much of the lyrics in a staccato manner, changing her flow every few lines, and slows down to switch to a falsetto vocal register in the chorus. Airy, sometimes manipulated vocals are combined with several vocal runs. "Blind" was written and recorded in 2022, after Rob Bisel approached Carter Lang to record some tracks for SZA.

Joining Bisel and Lang for their sessions were producer Will Miller and instrumentalist Yuli. Their goal was to create orchestral music that evoked a sound Lang described as "very minimal" and "beautifully haunting", which resulted in twenty demos that included "Blind" and the SOS bonus track "PSA" (2023). After they arranged the layering on the demos and SZA wrote lyrics over them, Bisel sent "Blind" to Lang so they could layer her vocals, add their own, and put the synthesized guitar strings. Miller added the trumpets and Yuli more strings afterwards. "Blind" was going to incorporate drums as well, but Lang decided it did not fit with the song.

When conceptualizing how the music would sound, Yuli said that while they believed "Blind" fit the album's overall production, making it sound like much of SZA's past works was not their main priority. According to her, the reason it fit well with the album was because the song was made "from a place of love"; Yuli spoke to Genius, "We're not going to bring this hungry energy into the session. We're just going to create and be open and see how it comes out, and that's why I feel like the song has the energy it does." Out of the many producers who worked on songs for SOS, Yuli is the only woman. She felt special about this distinction, but at the same time, she was disappointed: "there's not enough women doing this [in albums]. We need to change this".

== Lyrics ==
A recurring theme in SOS is duality, often with regards to validation of oneself and by others. On "Blind", SZA ruminates on how toxic relationships have damaged her self-esteem, exploring the conflict between a desire for a lasting romantic relationship and a desire for an independent life. She admonishes a former partner for his toxic demeanor but, at the same time, acknowledges that her attraction for him still remains. For example, she recounts a time he brought out a gun when their car stopped at a red light as such: "I like all that violence, give me dysfunction." In the song, SZA admits she is overcome with a combined sense of lust and loss despite the time that has passed.

The intersection between vulnerability and femininity is also explored. Unable to escape her past because her "pussy precedes [her]", SZA admits that her reputation has been reduced to her sexual encounters with ex-boyfriends and she is validated by having sex with one of them. His desire to have children and SZA's decision to take birth control is another facet of the conflict. In the chorus, SZA reflects on how self-love and the good things in life have eluded her, due to trust issues that stem from the failures of past romance. She tells a prospective partner that before they can get together, she needs to learn how to love herself first.

Many SOS tracks, including "Blind", incorporate wordplay and humorous pop culture references. SZA names boxer Muhammad Ali ("put the hood on, now they calling me Cassius") and stand-up comedian Bob Saget ("raunchy like Bob Saget"), comparing others' judgment of her as crude to that of other figures who have been perceived similarly. She also references Julia Stiles' character in the film Save the Last Dance ("I ain't no Julia Stiles, this ain't no last dance") and Jesus' resurrection ("third day, pop out the tomb"). Vulture's Zoe Guy wrote that the stylistic choice of adding pop culture references on "Blind" helped "add some spice to [SZA's] already well-seasoned lyrics about growing up and bitch-ass men".

== Release ==
During a Billboard cover story published in November 2022, SZA revealed the album title, as well as the release date which was scheduled sometime next month. She posted the album's track list on Twitter on December 5, and SOS was released four days later. Out of 23 songs, "Blind" appears as the sixth track. Upon its release, songs from SOS occupied the entire top 3 of Billboard's US Hot R&B/Hip-Hop Songs chart, with "Blind" at number three. Out of the 20 tracks that debuted on the Billboard Hot 100 simultaneously, "Blind" was the third highest, behind "Kill Bill" and "Nobody Gets Me". Elsewhere, "Blind" was a top 40 song in Australia, Canada, and New Zealand. (Note: See the charts section for the exact peaks.)

Critics received "Blind" positively, called an album standout by some and praised primarily for its candid, intimate, and vulnerable songwriting. Wesley McLean of Exclaim! thought these qualities demonstrated SZA's greatest strength when it came to music. Labeling the song as its release week's "Best New Track", Pitchfork's Heven Haile said that these were the qualities of her best works and praised SZA's ability to turn her relationships' upsets into a source of honesty and beauty. For the same publication, Isabelia Herrera opined that "Blind" showed how SZA mastered the skill of poetically describing how painful and contradictory love, especially failed love, can be. She wrote: "When she raps, you can feel her claws protracting, muscles tightening in defense against the man coming for her heart. But her sung falsettos bear the ache of someone undone by their own needfulness." Also receiving praise were the song's wordplay, sense of humor, and orchestral production.

According to Rolling Stone's Will Dukes, the song's pensive nature provided SOS some of its "most moving moments". Stephen Thompson and Aisha Harris from NPR Music, as well as Andrew Chow and Moises Mendez II from Time, had similar opinions. The song, to them, contained some of the album's best lyrics, highlighting the lines about pregnancy as well as the intersection of loss and lust, respectively. "Blind" was mentioned in an NPR Music round-up of the best song lyrics of 2022, which said that the appeal comes from its relatability to anyone who has had to overcome insecurity and trust issues with romantic partners. Herrera ranked "Blind" at number 63 on Pitchfork's 100-entry list of the best songs of 2023, and Alex Hopper of American Songwriter placed "Blind" as the 10th best song in SZA's discography.

== Live performances ==
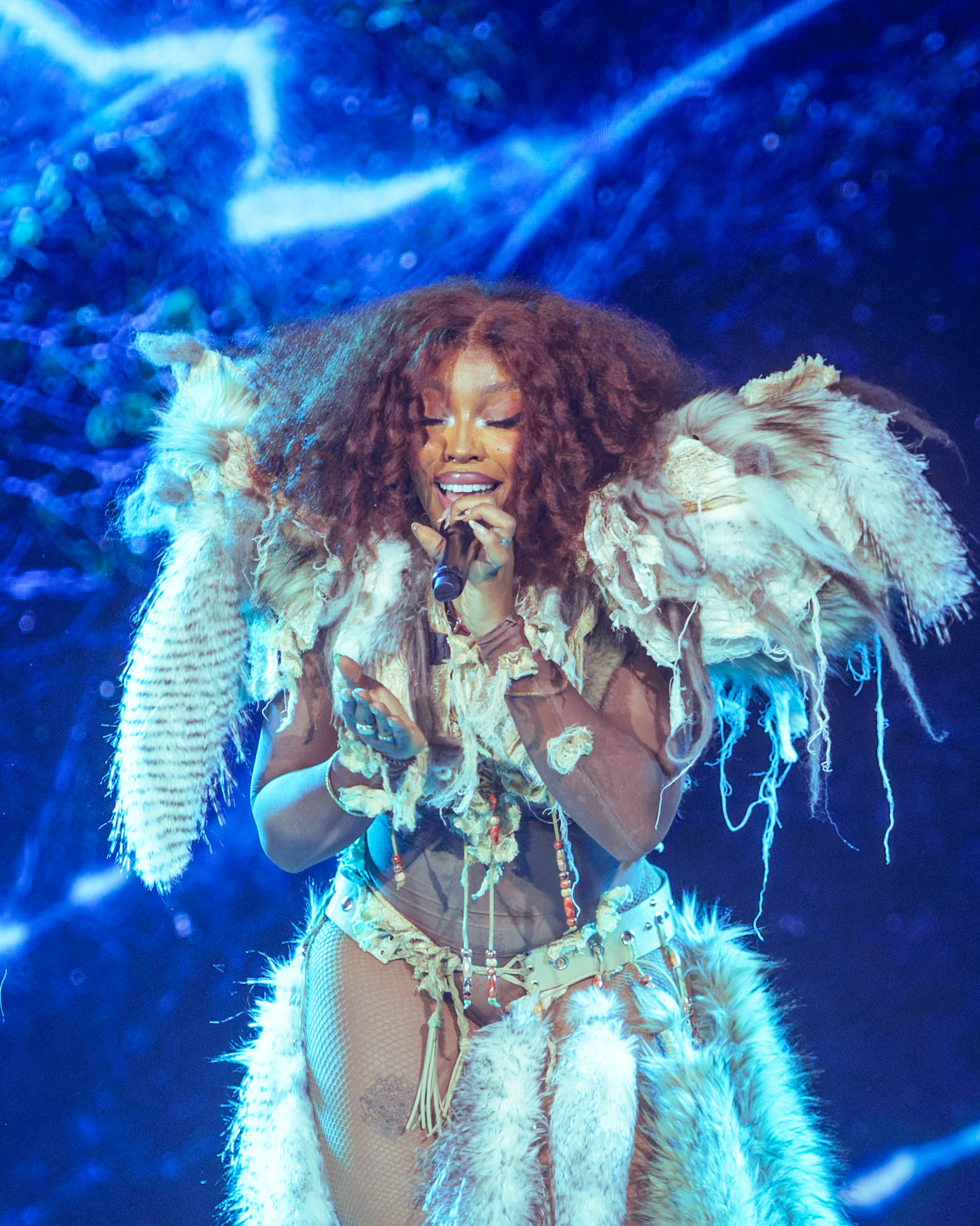
SZA performing "Blind" on the Grand National Tour in London

Apart from performing the song at Saturday Night Live, SZA included "Blind" regularly on set lists of the SOS Tour. It was also part of her set for Glastonbury 2024, where she was one of the headliners. In 2025, SZA embarked on the co-headlining Grand National Tour (2025) with rapper Kendrick Lamar, performing "Blind" during the concerts' fourth act.

== Credits ==
Recording and management

- Engineered at Westlake Studio A and Barn (Los Angeles, California)
- Mixed at Ponzu Studios
- Mastered at Becker Mastering (Pasadena, California)

Personnel

- Solána Rowe (SZA) – vocals, songwriting
- Rob Bisel – songwriting, production, acoustic guitar, keyboards, engineering, mixing
- Carter Lang – songwriting, production, keyboards
- Margaux Alexis Rosalena Whitney (Yuli) – songwriting, production, viola
- Will Miller – songwriting, production, keyboards
- Carson Graham – sound effects engineering
- Robert N. Johnson – assistant engineering
- Dale Becker – mastering
- Katie Harvey – assistant mastering
- Noah McCorkle – assistant mastering

== Charts ==
=== Weekly charts ===
Weekly chart performance for "Blind"
Chart (2022)	Peak position
Australia (ARIA)	27
Canada Hot 100 (Billboard)	17
Global 200 (Billboard)	19
Netherlands (Single Top 100)	95
New Zealand (Recorded Music NZ)	15
Portugal (AFP)	46
South Africa (Billboard)	20
UK Audio Streaming (OCC)	80
US Billboard Hot 100	12
US Hot R&B/Hip-Hop Songs (Billboard)	3

=== Year-end charts ===
Year-end chart performance for "Blind"
Chart (2023)	Position
US Hot R&B/Hip-Hop Songs (Billboard)	46

== Certifications ==
Certifications for "Blind"
Region	Certification	Certified units/sales
Brazil (Pro-Música Brasil)	Platinum	40,000^{‡}
Canada (Music Canada)	Platinum	80,000^{‡}
New Zealand (RMNZ)	Platinum	30,000^{‡}
United Kingdom (BPI)	Silver	200,000^{‡}
United States (RIAA)	2× Platinum	2,000,000^{‡}
^{‡} Sales+streaming figures based on certification alone.
