= SOS (SZA album) =

- Digital cover

Studio album by SZA
- Released: December 9, 2022
- Recorded: 2017–2022
- Studios: SZA's house (Malibu); Rodney Jerkins' house; Carter Lang's house (Glendale); Ponzu (Los Angeles); Westlake (Los Angeles); Conway (Los Angeles); Shangri-La "The Chapel" (Malibu)
- Genres: R&B; hip-hop; pop
- Length: 67:51
- Labels: Top Dawg; RCA
- Producers: Aire Atlantica; Babyface; Beat Butcha; Blake Slatkin; Jeff Bhasker; Rob Bisel; Benny Blanco; BLK; Alessandro Buccellati; Matt Cohn; Darkchild; DJ Dahi; Freaky Rob; Teo Halm; Emile Haynie; Carter Lang; Los Hendrix; Will Miller; Nascent; Omer Fedi; The Rascals; Scum; Shellback; Sir Dylan; Skrrt; ThankGod4Cody; Michael Uzowuru; Jay Versace; Sammy Witte; Still Woozy; Yakob; Yuli

SZA chronology
| Ctrl (2017) | SOS (2022) | SOS Deluxe: Lana (2024) |

Singles from SOS
- 1. "Good Days" Released: December 25, 2020; 2. "I Hate U" Released: December 3, 2021; 3. "Shirt" Released: October 28, 2022; 4. "Nobody Gets Me" Released: January 6, 2023; 5. "Kill Bill" Released: January 10, 2023; 6. "Snooze" Released: April 25, 2023

SOS is the second studio album by American singer-songwriter SZA. It was released on December 9, 2022, by Top Dawg Entertainment (TDE) and RCA Records. The album features guest appearances from Don Toliver, Phoebe Bridgers, Travis Scott, and the late Ol' Dirty Bastard. SZA worked with a variety of record producers and songwriters such as Babyface, Jeff Bhasker, Rob Bisel, Benny Blanco, Darkchild, DJ Dahi, Ant Clemons, and Lizzo. It serves as the follow-up to SZA's debut album Ctrl (2017).

Six singles were released between 2020 and 2023 to promote SOS, five of which were top-ten hits on the US Billboard Hot 100. The fifth, "Kill Bill" (2023), was SZA's first song to top the Billboard Hot 100 and Billboard Global 200 charts; the sixth, "Snooze" (2023), was the only song remain on the Billboard Hot 100 chart throughout the entire year of 2023. The album spent thirteen nonconsecutive weeks atop the Billboard 200, doing so in three separate years, and set several consumption records in the US. It was the first album by a woman to spend 100 weeks in the Billboard 200's top 10, and in 2025, it became the longest-running US top-10 by a Black artist. To promote the album, SZA embarked on the international SOS Tour, from February 2023 to May 2024.

Upon release, the album received widespread critical acclaim for its eclectic sound and SZA's vocal delivery. Several media publications ranked it as one of the best albums of 2022 and 2023. At the 66th Annual Grammy Awards, SOS and its tracks received a total of nine nominations, including Album of the Year, and won Best Progressive R&B Album. Additionally, the album has been featured on both Rolling Stone's 500 Greatest Albums of All Time (2023) and Apple Music's 100 Best Albums. SOS was re-released on December 20, 2024, as Lana, with 15 additional tracks that include a guest appearance from Kendrick Lamar. In November 2025, SOS became the most-nominated album at the Grammy Awards (14), as well as the album with the most nominated individual tracks (9).

== Background ==
In 2017, SZA released her debut studio album, Ctrl. Primarily an R&B album that deals with themes of heartbreak and self-discovery, Ctrl was widely acclaimed by critics for its vocal performances and eclectic musical style, as well as the relatability, emotional impact, and confessional nature of its songwriting. The album brought SZA to mainstream fame, and critics credit it with establishing her status as a major figure in contemporary pop and R&B music and pushing the boundaries of the R&B genre. (Note: Cited to multiple sources: Vulture: "Raw, candid writing isn't new for SZA; it's what made the previous album, Ctrl, such a breakout and one of the high marks of the confessional R&B; of the past decade."; The Recording Academy: "The release of her critically acclaimed debut album Ctrl in 2017 solidified the artist not only as an R&B mainstay, but soundtracked the heartbreaks and growing pains of millions of young people. With her eloquent vocals and layered storytelling abilities, listeners felt every word like it was their own."; The Line of Best Fit: "her debut Ctrl has ascended to classic status, going down as one of the decade's best and cementing SZA's voice at the forefront of contemporary R&B, and of pop."; NME: Ctrl "ushered in a new era for R&B, one where the genre's boundaries shifted, bringing new levels of inventiveness into a classic sound and fusing it with indie, alternative, trap and more [...] SZA herself spent the aftermath of Ctrl trying to grapple with her new stardom and the huge impact that had on her life."; The Daily Telegraph: "Ctrl, the triple-platinum, four-time Grammy nominated debut that propelled SZA to popstar status"; The New Yorker: "Ctrl opened a portal—one that represented not just a major leap for the artist but a breakthrough for the genre itself. Her alternative slow jams pushed her voice to the fore and laid bare all the quirks of her dating life, establishing her as a distinguished millennial anecdotalist in the process."; Consequence: In Ctrl, "SZA's personal style of lyricism has always read like an endless diary entry, and the transcendent nature of her genre-shifting abilities helped revolutionize modern R&B and pop.")

SZA alluded to potentially releasing her second album as early as August 2019 during an interview with DJ Kerwin Frost. Revealing planned collaborations with the likes of Justin Timberlake, Jack Antonoff, Brockhampton, and Post Malone, she said that the release date was "soon as fuck" and she might "start dropping loosies", though there was no explicit date announced. Four months prior, Punch, CEO of SZA's record label Top Dawg Entertainment, teased that he had begun overseeing ideas for the project. During the interview, SZA commented on the creative process behind the album and stated it would be as candid and personal as Ctrl: "This next album is even more of me being less afraid of who am I when I have no choice? When I'm not out trying to curate myself and contain."

In January 2020, SZA posted a status update about the album's completion online. When asked by a fan on Twitter whether new music was coming soon, she replied that she and Punch had been discussing a potential release date scheduled for 2020 and she felt anxious about the build-up to that day. The next month, an interview between her and Rolling Stone was published, in which she announced recent collaborations with American record producer Timbaland, as well as Australian singer-songwriter Sia with whom she wrote three songs. The interview also mentioned the status of the album's release date; SZA said "music is coming out for sure", but the caveat was the album itself was unlikely to be released within the year.

After fans grew impatient with the release delays, SZA responded by venting her frustrations on Twitter in August 2020. Alleging that the label was the reason for the postponement, she affirmed one fan's suspicion that she had been having hostile interactions with Top Dawg, and when someone showed her a post from Punch saying that the album would be released soon, SZA replied with "this is all he says to me as well. Welcome to my fucking life." In response, fans created the Twitter hashtag #FreeSZA in support of her struggles, and the trend went viral. However, she later retracted her claims by deleting the posts and said "don't nobody need to free me. Lmao I'm not being held hostage n neither is my music!! Sometimes u gotta be patient... sometimes no is a blessing... I trust the ppl around me." Vulture and Variety noted that Ctrl also suffered a similar problem with its release date; SZA quarrelled with Top Dawg executives over its two-year delay and threatened to quit music because of it.

When SZA collaborated with Cosmopolitan for their February 2021 issue, she talked about the emotions she expected to feel while making the album. She told the magazine, "this album is going to be the shit that made me feel something in my...here and in here", pointing to her heart and gut. From April to May 2022, SZA told media outlets that she had recently finished the album in Hawaii, describing it as her most relatable or "unisex" body of work she had made to date. During the Met Gala and an interview with Complex, SZA claimed that the album was ready for release during summertime in the United States ("this summer, it will be a SZA summer"), but there was no urgent deadline for the release.

The release date continued to be delayed, and SZA once more argued that Top Dawg and RCA were responsible for it; the album would, contractually, be her last to be released through the labels. In October, she said that she had written around 100 songs for the album and added that the album could be released "any day now". During a Billboard cover story published in November, SZA revealed the title of her second studio album was SOS, scheduled for release sometime next month. She expressed her frustration with complying with music industry standards on promoting music, saying she had been stressed with meeting her deadlines. On December 3, 2022, she appeared on Saturday Night Live and announced it would be released on December 9. Two days later, she posted the track list on Twitter.

== Writing and production ==
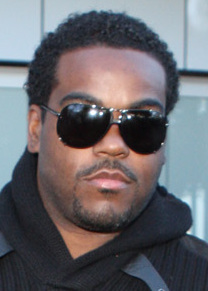
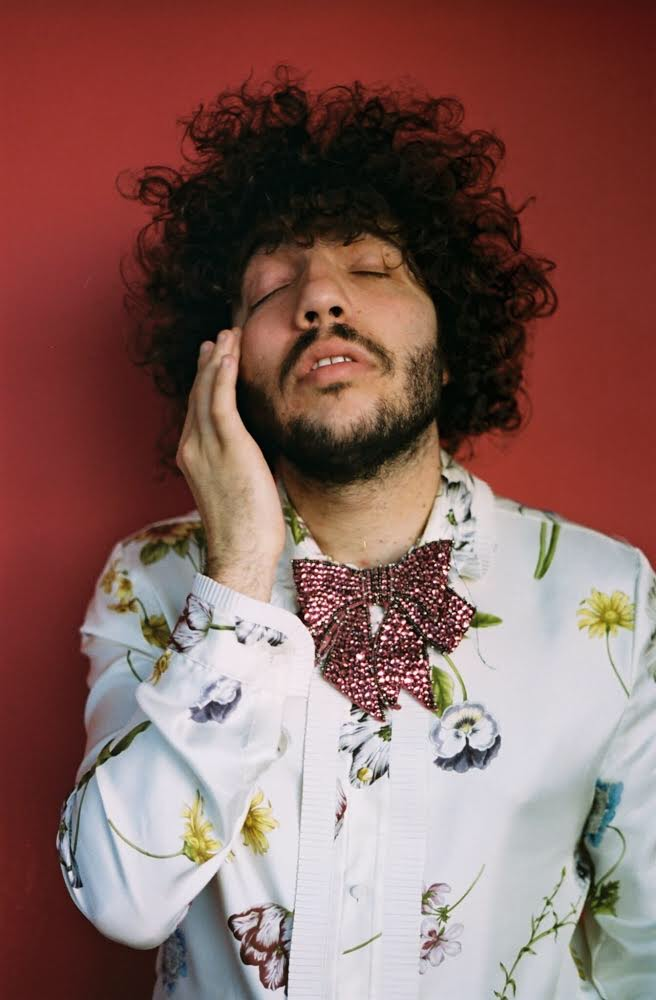
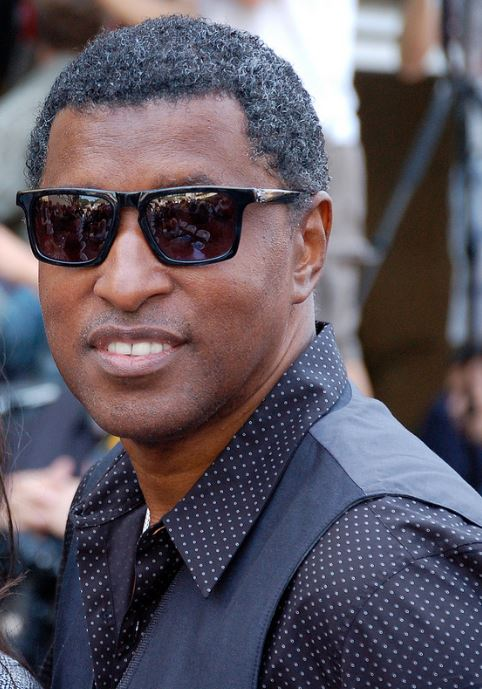
The production team for SOS included people such as Darkchild (left), Benny Blanco (middle), and Babyface (right).

Mainstream media had often characterized SZA as an R&B artist throughout her career. She refused to be pigeonholed to such a label, and she had been rejecting the R&B categorization as far as her early years of releasing music. When she released her debut label single, "Teen Spirit", to SoundCloud in 2014, she tagged the song with the categories "Glitter Trap" and "Not R&B". Although she did not aim to abandon or reduce her R&B soundscape for her second studio album, she wanted to prove her versatility, primarily as a statement against racially prejudiced ideas that discredit the works and cultural value of Black artists by segregating them from White artists and implying they can make only R&B music. In a 2022 Consequence cover story, SZA expressed her love for making Black music in general, arguing that such music "doesn't have to just be R&B". She said: "We started rock 'n' roll. Why can't we just be expansive and not reductive?"

Work on SOS had begun by 2019, but a majority of the songs were written and recorded in 2022 due to bursts of productivity from time pressure. Carter Lang, one of the producers, commented, "that's when [we] started feeling like, hey, 'We gotta do this shit like, it's been some years.' We bottled up that energy and everything was just sort of a preparation for that moment."

During the build-up to the album's release, SZA created a list of possible collaborators and reached out to them through private messages. The roster ranged from Billie Eilish, Harry Styles, and Olivia Rodrigo; to Doja Cat, Drake, and Kendrick Lamar. Of the several artists she contacted for the album, only three people sent their verses: Don Toliver, Phoebe Bridgers, and Travis Scott.

SZA worked with a number of songwriters and record producers including Babyface, Jeff Bhasker, Rob Bisel, Benny Blanco, Darkchild, DJ Dahi, Ant Clemons, and Lizzo. Rodney Jerkins was one of the main producers for SOS. SZA approached him out of her admiration for his decades-long history of production work, which included songs with Brandy and Amerie. He spoke of her: "her pen game is arguably one of the best pen games in the game right now. It's almost like she's a rapper tied up in a vocalist."

Having worked with SZA since 2014, ThankGod4Cody returned to co-produce and co-write seven tracks on SOS. His contributions began as early as the start of the album's making. Compared to his work on Ctrl, for which he helped produce four songs, his approach to SOS was less defined and more experimental. Whereas he sought to create uptempo tracks on Ctrl to contrast the album's more alternative songs, he was "throwing paint at the wall" and seeing which musical ideas worked well for SOS. The experimental sounds are present in tracks like the single "I Hate U" (2021), which Shelby Stewart of Okayplayer wrote felt "light with sublime progressions that sway with SZA's mood". The song arose from a keyboard loop from Rob Bisel, one of the album's main producers and engineers. After creating its structure and adding drums, SZA spent less than one hour to compose the melody and write the lyrics. For "Gone Girl", ThankGod4Cody took the electric piano from a demo by two of his co-producers and combined it with drums and a gospel choir. Adding the instruments took four days. He called "Gone Girl" his personal favorite from the album, citing the amount of time and effort he gave the song in comparison to the others.

== Composition ==
SOS is a multi-genre album, and many of the songs are combinations of R&B, hip-hop, and pop. It also incorporates influences of folk, indie rock, and electronica music. The album samples sound references from soul, gospel, jazz and melodic rap. SZA told Billboard that the sound of the album is "a varied palette", drawing on surf rock and grunge in parts alongside "her beloved lo-fi beats". It runs for 1 hour and 7 minutes (1:07), and according to TheGrio, it follows the tendency started by Chris Brown's 2017 album Heartbreak on a Full Moon of lengthier albums in the music streaming era.

In Complex, she described the album's sound: "I have no idea what it sounds like to anybody else. I really don't know. It's so bizarre. It's weird that I can't put my finger on it. It's a little bit of everything." She added that some parts of the song had an "aggressive" sound whereas others were soft or balladic. During the Rolling Stone interview, she and Punch spoke in length about the album's composition. The inspiration in question was eclectic, drawing from jazz, alternative rock, "traditional" R&B, country, and hip-hop. About the wide range of genres incorporated into the album, SZA said she did not care if her production choices made the album sound incohesive, because to her, "if you sound like you, your shit's going to be cohesive. Period." Punch commented: "It's a new chapter. She's not scared to try certain things now."

== Title and artwork ==
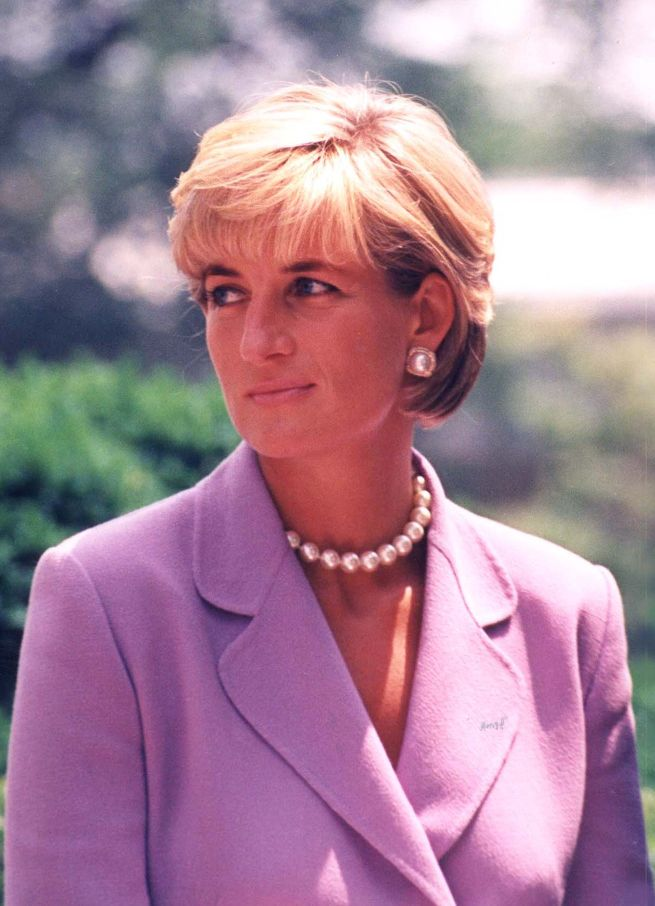
The album artwork was inspired by a paparazzi photo of Diana, Princess of Wales.

The explanation behind the album title is threefold. SOS is a nod to the Morse code distress signal SOS, which is used in maritime navigation and is popularly interpreted as either "save our ship" or "save our souls". The other two reasons are rooted in SZA's names. Her stage name is derived from the letters of the Supreme Alphabet, according to which the letter "S" stands for Self and Savior. In real life, her friends call her by the nickname Sous, a shortening of her first name, Solána.

On November 30, 2022, SZA posted the album cover on Instagram. The cover is a reference to a 1997 photo of Diana, Princess of Wales, in a similar pose aboard a yacht during a trip in Portofino, Italy, surrounded by the Mediterranean Sea. On the cover, SZA wears a modified version of the St. Louis Blues hockey jersey, with her name on the back and the album title on the sleeves. The jersey was designed by SZA's Art director, Jass Bell, who also worked with her on merchandise and cover artwork for the album's three pre-release singles.

SZA reported on the decision to associate the cover and album with Princess Diana's photo:

Originally I was supposed to be on top of, like, a shipping barge[.] But in the references that I pulled for that, I pulled the Diana reference because I just loved how isolated she felt and that was what I wanted to convey the most. And then at the last minute, we, like, didn't get clearance to get the shipping barges that we wanted and we were like, 'We're gonna build the diving board instead. We're still gonna try it.' We didn't nix the boat altogether and we tried it and it turned out cool and I wasn't sure it was going to be really cool until, like, right now.

== Promotion ==
SZA sporadically released music over a two-plus year period as she continued to work on the album and push back on release dates. Releasing music videos for these singles, the second half of the video teasers for her next single would play at the end. Every single from SOS, but "Shirt", reached the top 10 of the Billboard Hot 100—"Good Days", "I Hate U", "Nobody Gets Me", the chart-topping "Kill Bill", and "Snooze". At the end of a teaser video titled "PSA" released on her 33rd birthday, a message written in Morse code can be seen, which after being translated spells out "S.O.S.". In an interview with Billboard released on November 16, 2022, SZA confirmed the theories about the album title and release date in December 2022. She further admitted to feeling "stressed" about meeting the release deadline.

SZA promoted the album on the December 3, 2022, episode of NBC's Saturday Night Live as a musical guest. She performed live the single "Shirt" and the at-the-time unreleased track "Blind", which she previously teased. On December 5, she posted a snippet of a song titled "Nobody Gets Me". A few hours later, she posted the tracklist of the album on her Twitter. "Kill Bill" and "Nobody Gets Me" were promoted to US contemporary hit radio on January 10, 2023.

On December 13, 2022, SZA took to social media to announce merchandise for SOS, which included the St. Louis Blues jersey she wore in the cover art. At the same time, she revealed she would be touring North America in early 2023 in support of the album. The first leg of the SOS Tour consisted of shows across 17 cities in Canada and the United States, and Omar Apollo was announced to be the opening act. The first show was on February 21, 2023, at the Schottestein Center in Columbus, Ohio; and the last was on March 23, 2023, at the Kia Forum in Inglewood, California. Tickets went on sale via SZA's website on December 16, 2022, at 12 pm Pacific Standard Time, with pre-sales hosted by Ticketmaster one day beforehand. Three weeks after the second Inglewood show, SZA announced 35 more shows for the SOS Tour due to high demand. It included a new leg in Western Europe, with 15 dates in seven countries. Pre-sales were on April 12, 2023, starting 10 am local time, and an on-sale occurred two days later. British singer Raye has been set to perform as the opening for the European dates. After touring Europe, SZA returned to North America for 21 concerts in the United States and another concert in Canada. Pre-sales were on April 13 at 10 am local time, and tickets went on sale on April 14 at 12 pm local time.

"Snooze" was sent to radio stations in the United States on April 25, 2023, as the sixth single from SOS. It was the only song to spend all weeks of 2023 charting on the Billboard Hot 100.

In November 2024, British Vogue claimed that the deluxe edition of SOS was said to be releasing that fall, alongside the singer's third studio album Lana. Lana eventually became the name of the deluxe edition of SOS, which was released on December 20, 2024, and featured an additional 15 tracks, including the singles "Saturn" and "Drive".

== Critical reception ==
=== Reviews ===
Professional ratings
Aggregate scores
| Source | Rating |
|---|---|
| AnyDecentMusic? | 8.3/10 |
| Metacritic | 90/100 |
Review scores
| Source | Rating |
| AllMusic | 4.5/5 stars |
| The Daily Telegraph | 5/5 stars |
| DIY | 5/5 stars |
| Exclaim! | 9/10 |
| The Guardian | 4/5 stars |
| The Line of Best Fit | 8/10 |
| NME | 5/5 stars |
| Pitchfork | 8.7/10 |
| Rolling Stone | 4/5 stars |
| Slant Magazine | 4/5 stars |

SOS received widespread critical acclaim upon its release. At Metacritic, which assigns a normalized rating out of 100 based on reviews from critics, the album received a score of 90 out of 100, based on 20 reviews, indicating "universal acclaim".

Critics agreed that SOS surpassed expectations that arose from its years-long wait. Julianne Escobedo Shepherd of Pitchfork named the album "Best New Music", stressing how it "solidifies her position as a generational talent, an artist who translates her innermost feelings into indelible moments". Alexis Petridis of The Guardian wrote that the results of the album "are hugely eclectic", finding it "simultaneously impressive and a little exhausting". Petridis found that the songs "shine harder individually than taken in toto, where the sheer profusion causes them to merge into one, blended by a mood of stoned melancholy", with a final product of a "unwieldy" album, where SZA sounds as "a fabulous vocalist, powerful but unshowy, capable of shifting seamlessly into melodic rap".

NME's writer Rhian Daly reported that "under SZA's command it feels cohesive, organic and like every skip into a new genre is completely justified for each track", pointing out that SOS is "a phenomenal record that barely puts a foot wrong and raises the bar even higher than she set it before". Cady Siregar by Consequence defined the album "an assured, ambitious, expansive, and genre-defying journey into the very depths of heartbreak and the many shades it comes in". The journalist emphasized that in Ctrl there is no predefined musical genre, because "the theme lies in her vocal prowess, the daringness of her vision, and her lyrical frankness".

Wesley McLean of Exclaim! highlighted the quality of the writing throughout the project, stating that, "SZA's ability to communicate her deepest feelings and insecurities in such an intimate and personal manner remains her greatest strength," adding that, "her writing, even at its simplest, is effortlessly and immediately gripping."

Reviewing the album for AllMusic, Andy Kellman compared it favourably to SZA's previous album; "Hour-plus length and stylistic variety likewise signal that SOS could be the overreaching kind of highly anticipated follow-up. Still, it's an advancement from Ctrl in every respect apart from cohesion." Writing for Rolling Stone, Will Dukes also commented on the album's runtime; "SOS is very long – 23 tracks, well over an hour. It suggests someone continually adding to and augmenting a project, or perhaps throwing everything they've got at it, fuelled by the feeling that they might not do this again. The results are hugely eclectic."

=== Year-end rankings ===
By the time SOS was released, many authors and publications had already released their respective year-end best-of album lists. In the Sydney Morning Herald, Giselle Au-Nhien Nguyen commented that the album's December release was a "bold move" and a reminder that critics should have waited until the year was almost over before curating their rankings. Nonetheless, some that released later lists included SOS. These include Mesfin Fekadu for The Hollywood Reporter (2nd out of 10 albums), Jem Aswad for Variety (10th out of 10), Allan Raible for Good Morning America (10th out of 50), Spin (10th out of 22), Consequence (11th out of 50), and Beats Per Minute (22nd out of 50).

Because SOS was released too late to be included in 2022 year-end lists, several publications listed it among their best albums of 2023 instead. It topped the year-end rankings curated by Pitchfork, Rolling Stone, Mikael Wood for the Los Angeles Times, and Dan Deluca for The Philadelphia Inquirer; and appeared in Jon Pareles' and Jon Caramanica's respective listicles for The New York Times. Ranking SOS among their top 5 were Complex (2), The Ringer (4), Maura Johnston for Time (3), and Spencer Kornhaber for The Atlantic (4). Other listicles that featured the album included those by NPR Music (placed), Dazed (7th out of 20), The Independent (13th out of 30), The A.V. Club (19th out of 27), The Fader (25th out of 50), Carl Wilson for Slate (placed), and David Renshaw for Wired (placed).

== Awards ==
SOS was named Album of the Year at the 2023 BET Awards, tying with Beyoncé's Renaissance; it also received Album of the Year at the 2023 Soul Train Awards and an Album of the Year nomination at the 2023 MTV Video Music Awards. Rolling Stone ranked SOS at number 351 on the 2023 iteration of their "500 Greatest Albums of All Time" list, writing: "If there was ever any doubt that SZA was a key voice in her generation, SOS decimated it. Her second LP was cunning and full of surprises, but its staying power outshone its shock value." Its loss of the Grammy Award for Album of the Year at the 66th ceremony to Taylor Swift's Midnights was deemed a snub by Billboard: "It topped the Billboard 200 for 10 weeks, longer than any of this year's other album of the year nominees [...] More than a few fans of R&B and hip-hop are saying 'What does it take?'" On November 7, 2025, SOS became the album with the most nominations at the Grammy Awards, with 14 nominations, surpassing Thriller, as well as the album with the most nominated individual tracks, with 9.

List of awards and nominations received by SOS
| Year | Award | Category | Result | Ref. |
|---|---|---|---|---|
| 2023 | ARIA Music Awards | Best International Artist | Nominated | |
| 2023 | BET Awards | Album of the Year | Won | |
| 2023 | MTV Video Music Awards | Album of the Year | Nominated | |
| 2023 | Billboard Music Awards | Top Billboard 200 Album | Nominated | |
| 2023 | Billboard Music Awards | Top R&B Album | Won | |
| 2023 | Soul Train Music Awards | Album of the Year | Won | |
| 2024 | Grammy Awards | Album of the Year | Nominated | |
| 2024 | Grammy Awards | Best Progressive R&B Album | Won | |
| 2024 | iHeartRadio Music Awards | R&B Album of the Year | Won | |
| 2024 | Juno Awards | International Album of the Year | Won | |

== Commercial performance ==
The album was a massive commercial success. Fueled by a five-year wait for its release, it debuted at number 1 on the US Billboard 200 with 318,000 equivalent album units sold. From 2022 to 2023, it remained atop the chart for ten non-consecutive weeks. SOS was the first album by a woman to top the Billboard 200 for at least ten weeks since Adele's 25 (2015–2016), the first R&B/hip-hop album to do so since Drake's Views (2016), and the first R&B album by a woman to do so since Mariah Carey's self-titled debut in 1991. Following the release of its deluxe reissue Lana (2024), SOS returned to number 1 for an eleventh non-consecutive week in 2025. In doing so, it became the album with the longest time between weeks atop the chart.

SOS set and broke several consumption records in the US throughout a timespan of three years. It became the first album by a woman to spend 100 weeks on the Billboard 200's top 10, and it surpassed Michael Jackson's Thriller as the longest-running top-10 by a Black artist. It opened with 404.58 million on-demand official streams, marking the second-largest streaming week for an album by a woman and breaking the record for the biggest streaming week for an R&B album. SOS was the second most-streamed album worldwide and the top certified album in the US in 2023.

Elsewhere, SOS entered within the top 5 of 10 countries: it debuted atop charts in Canada, Netherlands, Denmark, and New Zealand; at number 2 in Australia (in which it peaked at number 1 in its seventh week), the UK, and Ireland; at number 3 in Norway, Portugal and Denmark; and number 4 in Sweden and Switzerland, which peaked at second spot later. Also, top five in Belgium, top twenty in Slovakia, Finland, Austria and top thirty in Spain, France and Hungary. SOS's singles have also seen significant success on American radio, with "Kill Bill", "I Hate U", and "Snooze" all topping the Rhythmic airplay chart, and the former becoming her first solo number 1 on the Pop Airplay chart and the longest running number 1 on the Hot R&B/Hip-Hop Songs chart by a female artist. With "SOS", SZA established the record of the longuest-running album for a black female artists and a R&B artist overall in the 2020s in several European countries, such as Belgium and the Netherlands (153 weeks), France (152 weeks), Norway (134 weeks), Switzerland (133 weeks), and Denmark (109 weeks).

== Track listing ==
SOS track listing
| No. | Title | Writer(s) | Producer(s) | Length |
|---|---|---|---|---|
| 1. | "SOS" | Solána Rowe; Jahlil Gunter; Rob Bisel; Gabriel Hardeman | Jay Versace | 1:57 |
| 2. | "Kill Bill" | Rowe; Bisel; Carter Lang | Bisel; Lang | 2:33 |
| 3. | "Seek & Destroy" | Rowe; Bisel; Lang; Tyran Donaldson; Cody Fayne | Bisel; Lang; Scum; ThankGod4Cody | 3:23 |
| 4. | "Low" | Rowe; Jocelyn Donald; Bisel; Alessandro Buccellati; Joseph Pincus; Rashad Johnson | Bisel; Buccellati; Aire Atlantica | 3:01 |
| 5. | "Love Language" | Rowe; Lang; Fayne; Jakob Rabitsch; Bisel; Tyrone Griffin, Jr.; Anthony Clemons, Jr.; Pharrell Williams; Chad Hugo; Jazzaé De Waal | Lang; ThankGod4Cody; Yakob; Bisel^{[v]} | 3:03 |
| 6. | "Blind" | Rowe; Bisel; Lang; Will Miller; Margaux Whitney | Bisel; Lang; Miller; Yuli | 2:30 |
| 7. | "Used" (featuring Don Toliver) | Rowe; Caleb Toliver; John Hill; Dacoury Natche; Danny McKinnon; John Key; Ely Rise | DJ Dahi; McKinnon^{[a]}; Key^{[a]}; Rise^{[a]}; Bisel^{[v]} | 2:26 |
| 8. | "Snooze" | Rowe; Kenneth Edmonds; Khristopher Riddick-Tynes; Leon Thomas III; Blair Ferguson | Babyface; The Rascals; BLK^{[v]} | 3:21 |
| 9. | "Notice Me" | Rowe; Bisel; Lang; Fayne; Teo Halm; Michael Uzowuru | Bisel; Lang; ThankGod4Cody; Halm; Uzowuru | 2:40 |
| 10. | "Gone Girl" | Rowe; Bisel; Lang; Fayne; Jeff Bhasker; Emile Haynie | Bisel; Lang; ThankGod4Cody; Bhasker; Haynie | 4:04 |
| 11. | "Smoking on My Ex Pack" | Rowe; Gunter; Clarence Scarborough; Raina Taylor | Jay Versace | 1:23 |
| 12. | "Ghost in the Machine" (featuring Phoebe Bridgers) | Rowe; Phoebe Bridgers; Bisel; Lang; Matt Cohn; Marshall Vore | Bisel; Lang; Cohn^{[a]}; Ethan Gruska^{[v]}; Tony Berg^{[v]} | 3:38 |
| 13. | "F2F" | Rowe; Bisel; Lang; Melissa Jefferson | Bisel; Lang | 3:05 |
| 14. | "Nobody Gets Me" | Rowe; Bisel; Lang; Benjamin Levin | Bisel; Lang; Benny Blanco | 3:00 |
| 15. | "Conceited" | Rowe; Fayne; Bisel | ThankGod4Cody | 2:31 |
| 16. | "Special" | Rowe; Bisel; Levin; Johan Schuster; Blake Slatkin; Omer Fedi | Benny Blanco; Shellback; Slatkin; Fedi | 2:38 |
| 17. | "Too Late" | Rowe; Bisel; Lang; Fayne; Sven Gamsky; Samuel Witte | Bisel; Lang; ThankGod4Cody; Still Woozy; Witte | 2:44 |
| 18. | "Far" | Rowe; Bisel; Lang; Donaldson; Eliot Dubock; Carlos Muñoz | Bisel; Lang; Scum; Beat Butcha; Los Hendrix | 3:00 |
| 19. | "Shirt" | Rowe; Rodney Jerkins; Robert Gueringer | Darkchild; Freaky Rob | 3:01 |
| 20. | "Open Arms" (featuring Travis Scott) | Rowe; Jacques Webster II; Bisel; Halm; Uzowuru; Douglas Ford | Bisel; Halm; Uzowuru | 3:59 |
| 21. | "I Hate U" | Rowe; Bisel; Lang; Fayne; Dylan Patrice | Bisel; Lang; ThankGod4Cody; Sir Dylan | 2:54 |
| 22. | "Good Days" | Rowe; Jacob Collier; Lang; Muñoz; Christopher Ruelas | Lang; Los Hendrix; Nascent; Bisel^{[v]} | 4:39 |
| 23. | "Forgiveless" (featuring Ol' Dirty Bastard) | Rowe; Russell Jones; Guy Sigsworth; Björk Guðmundsdóttir; Jerkins | Darkchild | 2:21 |
| Total length: | | | | 67:51 |

Digital webstore and Japanese CD edition bonus tracks
| No. | Title | Writer(s) | Producer(s) | Length |
|---|---|---|---|---|
| 24. | "PSA" | Rowe; Lang; Miller | Lang; Miller | 1:38 |
| 25. | "Open Arms" (solo version) | Rowe; Bisel; Halm; Uzowuru; Ford | Bisel; Halm; Uzowuru | 3:34 |
| Total length: | | | | 73:03 |

Notes

- ^{^[a]} signifies an additional producer.
- ^{^[v]} signifies a vocal producer.
- "Ghost in the Machine" and "Far" feature additional vocals from Sadhguru.
- "Low" features additional vocals from Travis Scott.

Sample credits

- "SOS" contains an interpolation of "Listen", performed by Beyoncé, and written by Beyoncé Knowles, Scott Cutler, Henry Krieger and Anne Preven; and a sample of "Until I Found the Lord (My Soul Couldn't Rest)", performed by the Gabriel Hardeman Delegation, and written by Gabriel Hardeman.
- "Love Language" contains an interpolation of "I Don't Wanna", and performed by Aaliyah, and written by Johntá Austin, Jazze Pha, Donnie Scantz and Kevin Hicks; and a sample of "Hit Different", performed by SZA featuring Ty Dolla Sign, and written by Solána Rowe, Tyrone Griffin Jr., Pharrell Williams, Chad Hugo, and Rob Bisel.
- "Smoking on My Ex Pack" contains a sample of "Open Up Your Eyes", performed by Webster Lewis and written by Clarence Scarborough.
- "Good Days" contains an interpolation of "In Too Deep", performed by Jacob Collier featuring Kiana Ledé and written by Collier.
- "Forgiveless" contains a sample of "Hidden Place", written and performed by Björk; and "The Stomp", written and performed by Ol' Dirty Bastard.

== Personnel ==
Instruments

- SZA – lead vocals (all tracks); background vocals (tracks 14, 16, 20)
- Travis Scott – additional vocals (4); lead vocals (20)
- Don Toliver – lead vocals (7)
- Phoebe Bridgers – lead vocals (12)
- Lizzo – background vocals (13)
- Granny – skit (7, 20)
- Sadhguru – skit (12, 18)
- Alexandria Arowora – choir (10)
- Aire Atlantica – programmed drums (4)
- Rob Bisel – guitars (2, 13); bass (2, 13, 17); Mellotron (2); choir (2, 12); keyboards (3, 4, 6, 12, 13, 17); additional vocals (4); acoustic guitar (6); drums, piano (12); background vocals (14, 16, 20)
- Benny Blanco – keyboards, background vocals (16)
- Erik Brooks – choir (10)
- Jewchelle Brown – choir (10)
- Alessandro Buccellati – keyboards, accordion (4)
- Imani Carolyn – choir (10)
- Storm Chapman – choir (10)
- Matt Cohn – drums (12)
- Jacob Collier – background vocals (22)
- Roman Collins – choir (10)
- Omer Fedi – keyboards (16)
- Teo Halm – guitar, drums, keyboards (20)
- Charles Harmon – choir (10)
- Joslynn James – choir (10)
- Anthony Johnson – choir (10)
- Carter Lang – guitars (2, 13); bass (2, 13, 17); drums (2, 12, 13); choir (2, 12); keyboards (3, 6, 12, 13, 17); piano (12)
- Chelsea Miller – choir (10)
- Will Miller – keyboards (6)
- Dylan Neustadter – choir (10)
- Scum – keyboards (3)
- Blake Slatkin – keyboards, guitar (16)
- Still Woozy – guitars (17)
- Stix – drums (10)
- Syd Tagle – choir (10)
- ThankGod4Cody – keyboards, programmed drums (3); choir (10); drums (17)
- Sammy Witte – guitars (17)
- Yuli – viola (6)

Technical

- Derek "206derek" Anderson – vocal engineering, vocal mixing (4, 7, 20)
- Dale Becker – mastering (all tracks)
- Rob Bisel – engineering (all tracks); sound effects engineering (1); mixing (2, 6, 8, 12, 19–21); vocal mixing (1, 3, 17)
- Benny Blanco – programming (14, 16); engineering (16)
- Rachel Blum – assistant mixing (3, 17, 23)
- Bryce Bordone – engineering for mix (14, 16)
- Jon Castelli – mixing (4, 7, 11, 15)
- Hector Castro – engineering (9, 15, 19, 21)
- Austin Christy – assistant engineering (15)
- Josh Deguzman – engineering for mix (4, 7, 11, 15)
- Jeremy Dilli – assistant engineering (16, 18)
- DJ Riggins – assistant mixing (3, 17, 23)
- Hayden Duncan – assistant engineering (3, 10, 12, 15, 16)
- Shelby Epstine – assistant engineering (20)
- Shawn Everett – mixing (1, 22); mastering (22)
- Omer Fedi – programming (16)
- Patrick Gardner – assistant engineering (14)
- Serban Ghenea – mixing (14, 16)
- Carson Graham – sound effects engineering (1, 5, 6, 9, 10, 17, 18)
- Katie Harvey – assistant mastering (all tracks)
- Noah Hashimoto – assistant engineering (7, 13)
- Robert N. Johnson – assistant engineering (2, 4–6, 9, 12–15, 17–21)
- Jaycen Joshua – mixing (3, 17, 23)
- Derek Keota – engineering (19, 23)
- Carter Lang – programming (14)
- Jonathan Lopez – assistant engineering (8, 14)
- Will Maclellan – vocal engineering (12)
- Manny Marroquin – mixing (5, 18)
- Noah McCorkle – assistant mastering (all tracks)
- Dylan Neustadter – engineering (10, 11)
- Dana Nielsen – mixing (9, 10, 13)
- Trey Pearce – assistant engineering (2, 9, 17)
- Zach Pereyra – assistant mixing (5, 18)
- Micah Pettit – engineering (19, 23)
- Kaushlesh "Garry" Purohit – assistant engineering (7)
- Jacob Richards – assistant mixing (3, 17, 23)
- Dave "Spanks" Schwerkolt – engineering (16)
- Mike Seaberg – assistant mixing (3, 17, 23)
- Ben Sedano – assistant engineering (5, 7, 19)
- Shellback – programming (16)
- Jon Sher – assistant engineering (5)
- Blake Slatkin – programming (16)
- Trey Station – assistant mixing (5, 18)
- Syd Tagle – assistant engineering (2, 8, 10–12, 15–17)
- Ryan "Mellow" Venable – vocal engineering (7)
- Anthony Vilchis – assistant mixing (5, 18)
- Joe Visciano – vocal mixing (22)

== Charts ==
=== Weekly charts ===
Weekly chart performance
| Chart (2022–2025) | Peak position |
|---|---|
| Australian Albums (ARIA) | 1 |
| Australian Urban Albums (ARIA) | 1 |
| Austrian Albums (Ö3 Austria) | 13 |
| Belgian Albums (Ultratop Flanders) | 5 |
| Belgian Albums (Ultratop Wallonia) | 32 |
| Canadian Albums (Billboard) | 1 |
| Czech Albums (ČNS IFPI) | 10 |
| Danish Albums (Hitlisten) | 1 |
| Dutch Albums (Album Top 100) | 1 |
| Finnish Albums (Suomen virallinen lista) | 10 |
| French Albums (SNEP) | 26 |
| German Albums (Offizielle Top 100) | 32 |
| Hungarian Albums (MAHASZ) | 27 |
| Irish Albums (Official Charts) | 2 |
| Italian Albums (FIMI) | 34 |
| Japanese Albums (Oricon) | 35 |
| Japanese Hot Albums (Billboard Japan) | 100 |
| Lithuanian Albums (AGATA) | 3 |
| New Zealand Albums (RMNZ) | 1 |
| Nigerian Albums (TurnTable) | 23 |
| Norwegian Albums (VG-lista) | 1 |
| Polish Albums (ZPAV) | 68 |
| Portuguese Albums (AFP) | 3 |
| Scottish Albums (Official Charts) | 10 |
| Slovak Albums (ČNS IFPI) | 15 |
| Spanish Albums (Promusicae) | 22 |
| Swedish Albums (Sverigetopplistan) | 4 |
| Swiss Albums (Schweizer Hitparade) | 2 |
| UK Albums (Official Charts) | 2 |
| UK R&B Albums (Official Charts) | 2 |
| US Billboard 200 | 1 |
| US Top R&B/Hip-Hop Albums (Billboard) | 1 |
| US Indie Store Album Sales (Billboard) | 1 |

=== Year-end charts ===
Year-end chart performance
| Chart (2023) | Position |
|---|---|
| Australian Albums (ARIA) | 5 |
| Australian Hip Hop/R&B Albums (ARIA) | 1 |
| Belgian Albums (Ultratop Flanders) | 35 |
| Belgian Albums (Ultratop Wallonia) | 108 |
| Canadian Albums (Billboard) | 3 |
| Danish Albums (Hitlisten) | 12 |
| Dutch Albums (Album Top 100) | 4 |
| French Albums (SNEP) | 76 |
| Global Albums (IFPI) | 7 |
| Icelandic Albums (Tónlistinn) | 13 |
| New Zealand Albums (RMNZ) | 1 |
| Spanish Albums (PROMUSICAE) | 89 |
| Swedish Albums (Sverigetopplistan) | 67 |
| Swiss Albums (Schweizer Hitparade) | 22 |
| UK Albums (OCC) | 8 |
| US Billboard 200 | 3 |
| US Top R&B/Hip-Hop Albums (Billboard) | 1 |

Year-end chart performance
| Chart (2024) | Position |
|---|---|
| Australian Albums (ARIA) | 6 |
| Australian Hip Hop/R&B Albums (ARIA) | 1 |
| Belgian Albums (Ultratop Flanders) | 41 |
| Belgian Albums (Ultratop Wallonia) | 160 |
| Canadian Albums (Billboard) | 14 |
| Danish Albums (Hitlisten) | 14 |
| Dutch Albums (Album Top 100) | 14 |
| French Albums (SNEP) | 93 |
| Global Albums (IFPI) | 5 |
| Icelandic Albums (Tónlistinn) | 34 |
| New Zealand Albums (RMNZ) | 3 |
| Swedish Albums (Sverigetopplistan) | 87 |
| Swiss Albums (Schweizer Hitparade) | 65 |
| UK Albums (OCC) | 26 |
| US Billboard 200 | 6 |
| US Top R&B/Hip-Hop Albums (Billboard) | 2 |

Year-end chart performance
| Chart (2025) | Position |
|---|---|
| Australian Albums (ARIA) | 10 |
| Australian Hip Hop/R&B Albums (ARIA) | 1 |
| Belgian Albums (Ultratop Flanders) | 28 |
| Belgian Albums (Ultratop Wallonia) | 110 |
| Canadian Albums (Billboard) | 4 |
| Danish Albums (Hitlisten) | 21 |
| Dutch Albums (Album Top 100) | 14 |
| French Albums (SNEP) | 75 |
| Global Albums (IFPI) | 7 |
| New Zealand Albums (RMNZ) | 23 |
| Swiss Albums (Schweizer Hitparade) | 30 |
| UK Albums (OCC) | 21 |
| US Billboard 200 | 3 |
| US Top R&B/Hip-Hop Albums (Billboard) | 1 |

== Certifications ==
Certifications
| Region | Certification | Certified units/sales |
|---|---|---|
| Australia (ARIA) | 2× Platinum | 140,000^{‡} |
| Belgium (BRMA) | Gold | 10,000^{‡} |
| Brazil (Pro-Música Brasil) | Diamond | 160,000^{‡} |
| Canada (Music Canada) | 7× Platinum | 560,000^{‡} |
| Denmark (IFPI Danmark) | 3× Platinum | 60,000^{‡} |
| France (SNEP) | Platinum | 100,000^{‡} |
| Hungary (MAHASZ) | Gold | 2,000^{‡} |
| Italy (FIMI) | Gold | 25,000^{‡} |
| Netherlands (NVPI) | Platinum | 37,200^{‡} |
| New Zealand (RMNZ) | 8× Platinum | 120,000^{‡} |
| Poland (ZPAV) | Platinum | 20,000^{‡} |
| Portugal (AFP) | 2× Platinum | 14,000^{‡} |
| Spain (Promusicae) | Gold | 20,000^{‡} |
| Sweden (GLF) | Gold | 15,000^{‡} |
| Switzerland (IFPI Switzerland) | Gold | 10,000^{‡} |
| United Kingdom (BPI) | 2× Platinum | 600,000^{‡} |
| United States (RIAA) | 8× Platinum | 8,000,000^{‡} |
^{‡} Sales+streaming figures based on certification alone.

== Release history ==
Release history and formats for SOS
| Region | Date | Format | Label | Ref. |
|---|---|---|---|---|
| Various | December 9, 2022 | Digital download; streaming | Top Dawg; RCA | |
| Various | May 19, 2023 | CD; vinyl | Top Dawg; RCA | |

== See also ==
- List of Billboard 200 number-one albums of 2022
- List of Billboard 200 number-one albums of 2023
- List of Billboard 200 number-one albums of 2025
- List of number-one albums of 2022 (Canada)
- List of number-one albums of 2023 (Canada)
- List of number-one albums from the 2020s (New Zealand)
- Most number-one songs from female R&B album (R&B songs Chart)
- Most top ten songs from an R&B album (R&B Songs Chart)
