= Shirt (song) =

Single by SZA

from the album SOS
- Released: October 28, 2022
- Recorded: March 2020–2022
- Studio: Rodney Jerkins' home studio: Conway (Los Angeles); Westlake (Los Angeles)
- Genre: R&B
- Length: 3:02
- Label: Top Dawg; RCA
- Songwriters: Solána Rowe; Rodney Jerkins; Rob Gueringer
- Producers: Darkchild; Freaky Rob

SZA singles chronology
"Persuasive" (remix) (2022)	"Shirt" (2022)	"Nobody Gets Me" (2023)

Music video
- "Shirt" on YouTube

"Shirt" is a song by American singer-songwriter SZA and the third single from her second studio album, SOS (2022). Produced by Darkchild and Freaky Rob, it is an R&B song, with elements of trap music, backed by synthesizers and 808 beats. The lyrics are about a toxic relationship that consumes SZA and entices her to return, despite leaving her directionless and mentally exhausted. They include themes present throughout SOS: deep introspection, the pursuit of perfection, and the conflict between love and hatred. A snippet of "Shirt", prior to its official release, spawned a viral dance challenge on TikTok, where over a million videos used the sound. After being first previewed online two years beforehand, the song was released on October 28, 2022.

Critics praised "Shirt" for its songwriting. Some said that the introspective lyrics indicated maturity, and others wrote that it portrayed the self-destructive nature of romance well. Many included "Shirt" on their lists of the best songs of 2022. "Shirt" was a top-20 song in multiple countries; it debuted and peaked at number 11 on the US Billboard Hot 100 upon its release, the only single from SOS to not reach the top 10. The same day as the song's release, the "Shirt" music video, directed by Dave Meyers, premiered on YouTube. Inspired by Quentin Tarantino's crime films, it features SZA and LaKeith Stanfield committing several murders across town and eventually betraying each other. The video features several visual metaphors, which represent SZA's various emotional burdens that she figuratively kills.

== Background ==
SZA released her debut studio album, Ctrl, in 2017. Primarily an R&B album that deals with themes like heartbreak, it received widespread acclaim for her vocal performance, the songwriting, and the musical style. The album brought her mainstream fame, and critics credit it with establishing her as a major figure in contemporary pop and R&B music. (Note: Cited to Vulture, The Recording Academy, The Line of Best Fit, NME, The Daily Telegraph, The New Yorker, and Consequence.) After Ctrl, SZA began appearing in soundtracks and musical collaborations, which began media anticipation around her next studio album's release. In January 2020, SZA confirmed plans that she was working on the album, SOS, posting on Twitter in March that she was recording music with producer Darkchild at his home.

Speculation about the album's release increased with SZA's release of "Hit Different" featuring Ty Dolla Sign, her first solo single in five years, in September 2020. In October, SZA posted a short snippet of an unreleased song to her Instagram stories, and by December, it spawned a viral dance challenge on the video-sharing application TikTok, where over 1.3 million videos used the sound. Another single, "Good Days", was released the same month, previously teased at the end of the music video for "Hit Different".

The song SZA teased in October did not have a title, so fans started calling it by two names, "Bloodstain" and "Shirt". She told fans in a January 2021 Twitter post that she was fine with having "Shirt" be the song's title, eventually picking it as the official name. In March, she premiered the music video for "Good Days", and an extended snippet of "Shirt" appeared at the final scene, in which she pole dances in a gas station. SZA would continue to tease upcoming music at the end of her future videos.

== Music and production ==
"Shirt" is an R&B song with influences of trap music. It is three minutes long, has a midtempo pace, and is built around 808 beats; the song features synthesizers, drum breaks, glitchy hi-hat drums, and a heavy sub bass. It was produced by Darkchild and Freaky Rob. According to Billboard's Andrew Unterberger, Darkchild gave "Shirt" a sound reminiscent of 1990s R&B music: many commercially successful R&B singles from the 1990s had Darkchild as a producer, such as "Say My Name" (1999) by Destiny's Child and "The Boy Is Mine" (1998) by Brandy and Monica. As Gyasi Williams-Kirtley for The Fader wrote: "'Shirt' feels nostalgic but new". SZA sings with low and mixed notes for much of the song, occasionally using falsettos and performing breathily.

"Shirt" was one of the first songs, out of seven, that SZA and Darkchild created during the first day of their album recording sessions, when COVID-19 was announced as a pandemic in March 2020. Its released version significantly differs from the initial demo, which had a futuristic sound and the working title "Narnia Dirt Bike". Darkchild reworked the demo with Freaky Rob six months later, transferring the vocals on a more stripped-down track, and this version was the one SZA first posted on TikTok. The two had around seven or eight versions of the song throughout the years, and they played the final version to a Complex journalist for the magazine's cover story in October 2022.

== Lyrics ==
Aisha Harris of NPR Music wrote that "Shirt" contains lyrics that best represent the themes of SOS: deep introspection and the realization of one's self-worth and perfection. The song also discusses a conflict between love and hatred, another of the album's lyrical motifs, with SZA enticed to restart a past romance she acknowledges as toxic and codependent. She sings of how she has been overpowered by obsessive lust, desperate for the former partner's sexual advances. Simultaneously, she admits it has made her lose her dignity and motivated her to reclaim it.

The lyrics explore SZA's anxiety on what to do after the relationship's end, alongside her subsequent struggles with her imperfections. Religious and mythological concepts are invoked; she compares her confusion to an enveloping darkness and her lapses to sin, adding that nonetheless, she finds thrill in the turmoil. Beverly Bryan, writing for Spin, highlighted the lyric "comfort in my sins and all about me" and wrote about it: "if you hurt, at least you feel something, and if your life is a mess, at least it's yours."

A dark and furious tone also manifests in the song, to contrast the vulnerability critics wrote was characteristic of SZA's music. Emotions like disappointment, and vengefulness, are had about the failed romance. SZA sings in the pre-chorus: "feel the taste of resentment simmer on my skin". In the chorus, she invokes the image of blood on her shirt, as well as a "new bitch on [her] nerve" and an "old nigga [who] got curved" (or rejected), suggesting confidence that Raphael Helfand of The Fader described as being "fully in [one's] bag". Angry at herself for being tempted to return to the former partner, she follows with the line "damn bitch, you so thirsty". The pre-release "Shirt" had the lyric "damn bitch, you like 30" instead of the current one.

== Release ==
Darkchild wanted "Shirt" to be released in 2020, but SZA insisted she wanted more time to finish it. The song was still being finished by January 2021, and doing so became one of SZA's only priorities at the time. She continued to tease "Shirt" throughout 2021, sharing another preview on July 2 during a livestreamed online concert and saying on August 22, after uploading three songs on an anonymous SoundCloud account, that the song was her next single. In December, SZA released "I Hate U", the second single from SOS after "Good Days".

"Shirt" was set to be a collaboration with American rapper and singer Doja Cat, with the release date scheduled for October 14, 2022. As SZA revealed at Austin City Limits two days later, the release was postponed because she was dissatisfied with "one small thing" about the upcoming music video. The collaboration with Doja Cat was impeded when she had to undergo an emergency tonsil surgery around the time "Shirt" was being finished; the plan was for her to appear on the song's remix instead.

On October 21, "Shirt" was reportedly released on Spotify by mistake and removed from the platform as soon as possible. The official release happened a week later, without Doja Cat's vocals on the song. The release was accompanied by official merchandise by SZA and her art director Jas Bell: a white T-shirt on which was printed a bloodstain and the song's title. Also designed by Bell was the song's cover art—a picture of SZA's white, bloodstained shirt—which he created with simplicity in mind.

In a November Billboard cover story, SZA revealed the album's title as well as its release date, which was scheduled for next month. On December 5, she shared the track list on Twitter, and SOS was released four days later. Out of 23 songs, "Shirt" appears as the 19th track. The song was originally not going to be on the album, but fans' positive response towards it prompted her and label executives to change their mind. About the choice, she said: "Sometimes what I like doesn't line up with other people and that is tricky, always tricky. You never know what people want to see."

== Critical reception ==
=== Reviews ===
Songwriting was a recurring point of praise towards "Shirt". Some deemed the lyrics vivid; it was one of the compliments Julienne Pal Loreto from The Line of Best Fit gave the song, which they wrote made it SOS's standout track and worth the two-year wait. Bria McNeal of Esquire highlighted how SZA could create a "thick" story from mundane items like a shirt. Others pointed to its introspective nature. Pitchfork's Julianne Escobedo Shepherd and Cydney Lee of Billboard wrote that the song's reflections on outside validation were written in a relatable and mature way; Shepherd called the lyric "damn bitch you so thirsty" quotable. Meanwhile, Williams-Kirtley of The Fader and Will Dukes of Rolling Stone praised some of the lyrics for their, in their view, frenzied and animalistic tone.

Ashley Pointer for NPR Music and Isabelia Herrera for Pitchfork also wrote about the song's emotional intensity. The two believed that with "Shirt", SZA showcased one of her best abilities, which was to write about how the power of romance can overpower someone sexually and destroy them mentally. Pointer said, "One thing SZA knows well is the destructive depths of love and how to convey its all-consuming intensity in her music", and Herrera wrote: "[SZA] knows what it's like to be caught in an obsessive, disastrous relationship, one that robs us of our own dignity, and here she unravels her insecurities with brisk, yearning urgency." For Bryan of Spin, the mastery was at how SZA could find beauty in tumultuous mental burdens.

Other praises included SZA's vocals and the song's production. According to Dukes, as shown with the song's chorus, SZA turned sarcasm and spite into something that sounds "damn near angelic". Loreto liked the diverse range of notes she hits and thought "hard-hitting drums and mystical synths [...] wisely [let her] trademark lush vocals be the centrepiece". For NPR Music, Sidney Madden thought that the song's bass further highlighted the lyrics' emotional weight and the vocals conveyed the directionless nature of SZA's feelings. Precious Fondren of HipHopDX said that the song had replay value.

=== Accolades ===
"Shirt" has received several accolades, including placements on publications' rankings of the best songs of 2022. Williams-Kirtley and Vanessa Hsieh of Dazed included the song at numbers 10 and 7, respectively. Ranking "Shirt" in their top 15, meanwhile, were Lee (13) and Madden (15). Furthermore, in January 2023, American Songwriter named "Shirt" the sixth best song in SZA's discography.

At the 2023 MTV Video Music Awards, the "Shirt" music video was nominated for Best R&B and Best Art Direction, winning the former. However, SZA was not at the ceremony to receive the award because her manager, Punch, was unhappy she was not nominated for Artist of the Year. In 2024, the US music organization Broadcast Music, Inc. declared "Shirt" as one of the Most Performed R&B/Hip-Hop Songs of that year.

== Commercial performance ==
Out of the six singles from SOS, "Shirt" was the only song to not reach the top 10 of the US Billboard Hot 100. It debuted at number 11 with first-week figures of 20.3 million streams, 3000 downloads, and 990,000 in airplay audience, and it became her sixth top-10 entry on the Hot R&B/Hip Hop Songs chart, where it debuted and peaked at number 4. On charts for radio, "Shirt" peaked at number 2 on US R&B/Hip-Hop Airplay and US Rhythmic; in February 2023, it topped Mainstream R&B/Hip-Hop Airplay, her first song to do so, for two weeks. "Shirt" ended 2023 as the 51st biggest song in the US and 16th on Hot R&B/Hip-Hop Songs, and it is certified quadruple platinum by the Recording Industry Association of America (RIAA).

On the Billboard Global 200, "Shirt" was the 181st biggest song of 2023, and it peaked on the chart at its debut position of number 18. SZA earned her fifth top-20 entry in the United Kingdom with the song, which debuted on the UK Singles Chart at its peak of number 17. It also reached the top 20 in South Africa, New Zealand, Ireland, Canada, and Australia. (Note: Respectively, number 9, number 15, number 19, number 20, and number 20)

== Music video ==
Hours before the song's release, SZA revealed that the music video would premiere at the same time, teasing a clip of the video on Instagram that showed her about to shoot someone in a diner. The video, directed by Dave Meyers, takes cues from several crime films by Quentin Tarantino, such as Pulp Fiction (1994) and Jackie Brown (1997). It follows SZA and co-star LaKeith Stanfield as they go on a murder spree and other criminal escapades; multiple publications compared their dynamic to that of the real-life criminal couple Bonnie and Clyde.

The video is set in what Meyers called an "off-beat underworld" inspired by Tarantino's works, filled with symbolism around SZA's various mental burdens and a spiritual tone that juxtaposes the violent scenes. It begins with a conversation between her and Stanfield in a diner, discussing how everything is rooted in energy such as the salt shakers and the table in front of them. Stanfield asks SZA if energy intertwines both of them, but he is interrupted by a man beside him, whom Stanfield promptly slaps. SZA then kills the man for his intrusion.

The next scenes show SZA and Stanfield go into a shooting rampage across town in various disguises, such as nuns, medical staff, and pizza delivery workers. With each person SZA kills, she tattoos a colored dot on her wrist, all of which eventually form the word "SOS". Meyers said that the tattoos were symbols for all the burdens that SZA is eliminating. Throughout their escapades, the two encounter a room of pregnant women dressed as nuns, killing a man among them who bleeds purple blood; elsewhere, they murder a judge with green blood and a clown with pink blood. According to Meyers, the colors represented the burdens of, respectively, arrogance, judgment, and innocence.

After a while, Stanfield betrays SZA and fatally shoots her in the chest, then escapes. As her soul ascends towards the sky, Stanfield's face replaces hers; he then sees a vision of SZA on his rear-view mirror while driving at nighttime, causing him to crash. The events, per Meyers, indicate that Stanfield and SZA's characters are the same individual—Stanfield personifies SZA's ego that she eventually must leave for dead as well. Tied up in a basement, Stanfield wakes up to find several butchers about to kill him with their kitchen knives.

Now resurrected and by herself, SZA pulls a gun and swiftly turns her back to a wall, shooting her shadow until it dies. According to CJ Thorpe-Tracey in The Quietus, the act visually conveyed what SOS was about overall: "SZA represents herself shockingly often as a kind of shadow of herself in moments of death and of liberation, both at once [...] Like the shot-dead shadow, SZA liberates and destroys herself easily as blinking." Once her shadow dies, she pushes Stanfield's car off a pier and flees on a sailboat, symbolizing her feeling "lost at sea" but "free of burdens". After the song ends, the video begins playing a snippet of the song "Blind". In France, due to blasphemous, sexuals and violents scenes, the video was broadcast after 10p.m with a warning -12 (Not advised to kids under 12 years old : in French déconseillé aux moins de 12 ans).

== Live performances ==
SZA first performed "Shirt" for "In Bloom" on July 2, 2021, a concert in promotion of Grey Goose Essences's recent line of vodka. She again performed the song during the seventh episode of Saturday Night Live's forty-eighth season, days before the release of SOS. After the album's release, SZA embarked on the SOS Tour from 2023 to 2024, regularly having "Shirt" on the tour's set lists. She also included it on her sets for Glastonbury 2024 and the co-headlining Grand National Tour (2025) with rapper Kendrick Lamar. Concerts were divided into nine acts; SZA performed "Shirt" during the seventh.

== Credits ==
Recording and management

- Recorded at Conway Studio C, Westlake Studios A and D (Los Angeles, California), and Rodney Jerkins' home studio
- Mixed at Ponzu Studios (Los Angeles)
- Mastered at Becker Mastering (Pasadena, California)

Personnel

- Solána Rowe (SZA) – vocals, songwriting
- Rodney Jerkins (Darkchild) – songwriting, production (for Sonix. Inc.)
- Robert Gueringer (Freaky Rob) – songwriting, production
- Hector Castro – engineering
- Rob Bisel – engineering, mixing
- Derek Keota – engineering
- Micah Pettit – engineering
- Ben Sedano – assistant engineering
- Robert N. Johnson – assistant engineering
- Dale Becker – mastering
- Katie Harvey – assistant mastering
- Noah McCorkle – assistant mastering

== Charts ==
=== Weekly charts ===
Weekly chart performance for "Shirt"
Chart (2022–2023)	Peak position
Australia (ARIA)	20
Canada Hot 100 (Billboard)	20
Global 200 (Billboard)	18
Ireland (IRMA)	19
Lithuania (AGATA)	59
Netherlands (Single Top 100)	63
New Zealand (Recorded Music NZ)	15
Norway (VG-lista)	35
Philippines (Billboard)	22
Portugal (AFP)	61
South Africa (RISA)	9
Sweden (Sverigetopplistan)	47
Switzerland (Schweizer Hitparade)	76
UK Singles (Official Charts)	17
UK Hip Hop/R&B (Official Charts)	4
US Billboard Hot 100	11
US Hot R&B/Hip-Hop Songs (Billboard)	4
US R&B/Hip-Hop Airplay (Billboard)	2
US Rhythmic Airplay (Billboard)	2

=== Year-end charts ===
Year-end chart performance for "Shirt"
Chart (2023)	Position
Global 200 (Billboard)	181
US Billboard Hot 100	51
US Hot R&B/Hip-Hop Songs (Billboard)	16
US Rhythmic (Billboard)	15
US R&B/Hip-Hop Airplay (Billboard)	4

== Certifications ==
Certifications for "Shirt"
Region	Certification	Certified units/sales
Australia (ARIA)	Platinum	70,000^{‡}
Brazil (Pro-Música Brasil)	2× Platinum	80,000^{‡}
Canada (Music Canada)	3× Platinum	240,000^{‡}
New Zealand (RMNZ)	2× Platinum	60,000^{‡}
United Kingdom (BPI)	Gold	400,000^{‡}
United States (RIAA)	4× Platinum	4,000,000^{‡}
^{‡} Sales+streaming figures based on certification alone.

== Release history ==
Release history and formats for "Shirt"
Region	Date	Format	Label	Ref.
Various	October 28, 2022	Digital download; streaming	Top Dawg; RCA	
United States	November 8, 2022	Urban contemporary radio	Top Dawg; RCA	
United States	November 8, 2022	Rhythmic contemporary radio	Top Dawg; RCA	
Italy	December 2, 2022	Radio airplay	Sony Music Italy	
