= Nobody Gets Me =

Single by SZA

from the album SOS
- Released: January 6, 2023
- Genre: Alternative rock; country; folk
- Length: 3:00
- Label: Top Dawg; RCA
- Songwriters: Solána Rowe; Benjamin Levin; Carter Lang; Rob Bisel
- Producers: Benny Blanco; Carter Lang

SZA singles chronology
"Shirt" (2022)	"Nobody Gets Me" (2023)	"Kill Bill" (2023)

Music video
- "Nobody Gets Me" on YouTube

"Nobody Gets Me" is a song by American singer-songwriter SZA and the fourth single from her second studio album, SOS (2022). It was sent to Italian radio on January 6, 2023, and US contemporary hit radio four days later. The song peaked at number 10 on the US Billboard Hot 100, the Canadian Hot 100, and the Official New Zealand Music Chart.

== Background ==
SZA released her debut studio album, Ctrl, in 2017. Primarily an R&B album that deals with themes like heartbreak, it received widespread acclaim for SZA's vocal performance, the musical style, and the songwriting. The album brought SZA to mainstream fame, and critics credit it with establishing her as a major figure in contemporary pop and R&B music and pushing the boundaries of R&B. (Note: Cited to multiple sources) Her next studio album was highly anticipated, and she alluded to its completion as early as August 2019, during an interview with DJ Kerwin Frost.

Commenting on the creative process behind the album, SZA stated it would be just as candid and personal as Ctrl: "This next album is even more of me being less afraid of who am I when I have no choice? When I'm not out trying to curate myself and contain." When SZA collaborated with Cosmopolitan for their February 2021 issue, she spoke about her creative process for the album: "this album is going to be the shit that made me feel something in my...here and in here", pointing to her heart and gut.

From April to May 2022, SZA told media outlets that she had recently finished the album in Hawaii and said it was her most relatable or "unisex" body of work as of then. During an interview with Complex, she described the album's composition: "I have no idea what it sounds like to anybody else. I really don't know. It's so bizarre. It's weird that I can't put my finger on it. It's a little bit of everything", and she added that certain tracks on the album had a soft or balladic sound. SZA, in a Consequence cover story, further commented on her plans to experiment with various genres. She asserted it was "lazy" to reduce her to an R&B artist: "Black music doesn't have to just be R&B [...] Why can't we just be expansive and not reductive?"

During a Billboard cover story published in November, SZA revealed that the title of her second album was SOS, and it was scheduled for release sometime the following month. On December 3, 2022, she announced it would be released on December 9, and two days later, she posted the track list on Twitter. Out of 23 songs, "Nobody Gets Me" appears as the album's 14th track. The same day, SZA posted a snippet of the song on her YouTube account.

== Music and lyrics ==
SZA and Punch, president of her record label Top Dawg Entertainment, spoke in length about SOS's sound during an interview with Rolling Stone. The album's composition is eclectic; SZA incorporated elements of "traditional" R&B into the album, but she also took inspiration from several artists in jazz, hip hop, alternative rock, and country music. About the wide range of musical styles incorporated into SOS, Punch commented: "It's a new chapter. She's not scared to try certain things now." "Nobody Gets Me", a ballad backed by an acoustic guitar, combines two of these genres—alternative rock and country—with a contemporary folk musical style. Jon Caramanica of The New York Times wrote that the composition leaned towards alternative country.

In the lyrics, SZA recalls memories she made with her ex-fiancé, narrates all the events that strained their relationship and led to their break-up, and explains how she has felt in the aftermath. SZA spoke about the song's story in a radio interview prior to the album's release; she told the host that breaking up with him was like banishing herself to hell for the rest of her life because he was the only person who she thought could understand her feelings. She tried rekindling their relationship, but she turned out to regret her decision, and she also compared the experience to going to hell.

The first verse recounts a drunken argument they had at the MGM Grand shortly after they had sex: "you were balls deep, now we beefin'". She talks about how she screamed "fuck that" towards him, saying that even though she could barely remember it because she was drunk, she meant what she told him. Writing for The Quietus, CJ Thorpe-Tracey argued that the line was the lyric that best summarized SOS, because to him it aptly captured a recurring theme in the album in which SZA gets into several arguments with her ex-partners and tries to get over them quickly using coping mechanisms like sex. She returns to the present in the next few lines, urging him to "stick it in 'fore the memories get to kicking in" knowing that they both will regret it.

== Critical reception ==
Vulture and The Sydney Morning Herald praised the song's vocals, whereas Variety praised the melodic arrangement. In a 2025 ranking of SZA's discography, The Guardian critic Alexis Petridis rated "Nobody Gets Me" as her fourth-best song. He wrote that the lyrics deftly blended sexuality with sadness and vulnerability, with further praise for the "spectacular vocal pyrotechnics".

== Live performances ==
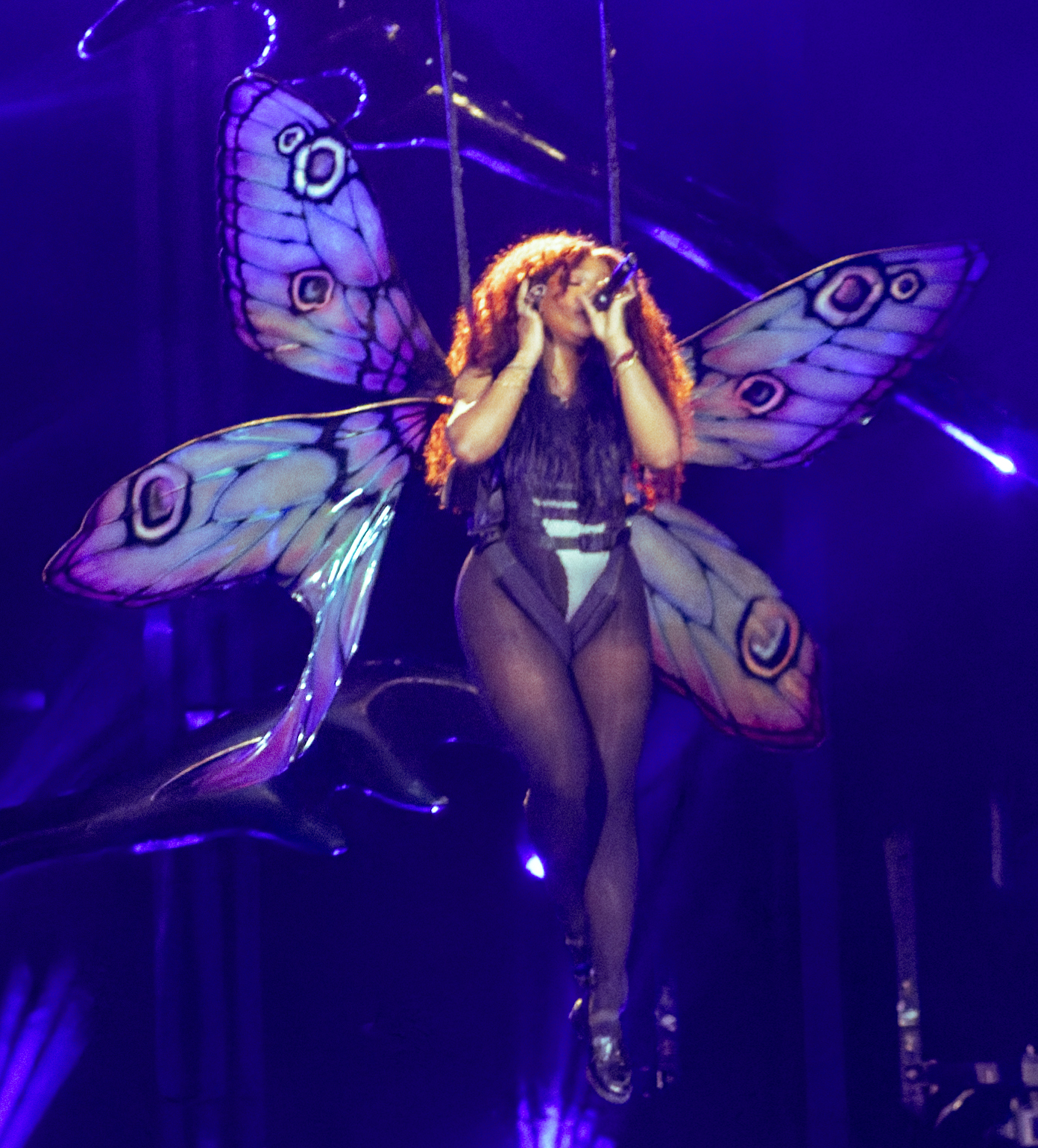
SZA performing "Nobody Gets Me" on the Grand National Tour in London

SZA debuted "Nobody Gets Me" live during the SOS Tour in 2023. She performed the song during a medley of the Ctrl track "Supermodel" as a life raft transported her above the stage. "Nobody Gets Me" was also included on the set lists of certain concerts in the Grand National Tour, which SZA is headlining with rapper Kendrick Lamar.

== Credits ==
Credits are adapted from the liner notes of SOS.

Recording and management

- Engineered at Westlake Studios A and C (Los Angeles, California)
- Mixed at MixStar Studios (Virginia Beach, Virginia)
- Mastered at Becker Mastering (Pasadena, California)

Personnel

- Solána Rowe (SZA) – lead vocals, songwriting, background vocals
- Benjamin Levin (Benny Blanco) – songwriting, production (for Matzah Ball Productions, Inc.), instruments, programming
- Carter Lang – songwriting, production, instruments, programming
- Rob Bisel – songwriting, background vocals, engineering
- Patrick Gardner – assistant engineering
- Robert N. Johnson – assistant engineering
- Jonathan Lopez – assistant engineering
- Serban Ghenea – mixing
- Bryce Bordone – engineering (for mix)
- Dale Becker – mastering
- Katie Harvey – assistant mastering
- Noah McCorkle – assistant mastering

== Charts ==
=== Weekly charts ===
Weekly chart performance for "Nobody Gets Me"
Chart (2022–2024)	Peak position
Australia (ARIA)	16
Canada Hot 100 (Billboard)	10
Canada CHR/Top 40 (Billboard)	27
Canada Hot AC (Billboard)	49
Global 200 (Billboard)	12
Greece International (IFPI)	52
Indonesia (Billboard)	10
Ireland (IRMA)	12
Malaysia (Billboard)	11
Malaysia International (RIM)	8
New Zealand (Recorded Music NZ)	10
Philippines (Billboard)	15
Portugal (AFP)	29
Singapore (RIAS)	17
Suriname (Nationale Top 40)	4
Sweden Heatseeker (Sverigetopplistan)	7
Switzerland (Schweizer Hitparade)	92
UK Singles (Official Charts)	27
UK Hip Hop/R&B (Official Charts)	5
US Billboard Hot 100	10
US Adult Contemporary (Billboard)	27
US Adult Pop Airplay (Billboard)	14
US Hot R&B/Hip-Hop Songs (Billboard)	2
US Pop Airplay (Billboard)	18

=== Year-end charts ===
2023 year-end chart performance for "Nobody Gets Me"
Chart (2023)	Position
Canada (Canadian Hot 100)	71
US Billboard Hot 100	77
US Hot R&B/Hip-Hop Songs (Billboard)	25

2024 year-end chart performance for "Nobody Gets Me"
Chart (2024)	Position
Australia Hip Hop/R&B (ARIA)	29

== Certifications ==
Certifications for "Nobody Gets Me"
Region	Certification	Certified units/sales
Australia (ARIA)	Gold	35,000^{‡}
Brazil (Pro-Música Brasil)	Platinum	40,000^{‡}
Canada (Music Canada)	4× Platinum	320,000^{‡}
Denmark (IFPI Danmark)	Platinum	90,000^{‡}
New Zealand (RMNZ)	3× Platinum	90,000^{‡}
United Kingdom (BPI)	Platinum	600,000^{‡}
United States (RIAA)	4× Platinum	4,000,000^{‡}
^{‡} Sales+streaming figures based on certification alone.

== Release history ==
Release history and formats for "Nobody Gets Me"
Region	Date	Format	Label	Ref.
Italy	January 6, 2023	Radio airplay	Sony Music	
United States	January 10, 2023	Contemporary hit radio	TDE; RCA Records	
