= Good Days =

Single by SZA

from the album SOS
- Written: 2014-2020
- Released: December 25, 2020
- Recorded: July 2014-2019
- Studio: SZA's house (Malibu, California)
- Genre: Psychedelic R&B
- Length: 4:39
- Label: Top Dawg; RCA
- Songwriters: Solána Rowe; Carter Lang; Christopher Ruelas; Carlos Munoz; Jacob Collier
- Producers: Carter Lang; Nascent; Los Hendrix

SZA singles chronology
"Hit Different" (2020)	"Good Days" (2020)	"Kiss Me More" (2021)

Music video
- "Good Days" on YouTube

"Good Days" is a song by American singer-songwriter SZA. It was released through Top Dawg Entertainment and RCA on December 25, 2020, as the lead single from her second studio album, SOS (2022). SZA wrote the song alongside Jacob Collier, who provides background vocals, and with producers Carter Lang, Los Hendrix, and Nascent.

"Good Days" peaked at number 7 on the Billboard Global 200; it was SZA's first song to chart in the top 10 of the Global 200. The song was also a top-10 hit in Australia, Ireland, Lithuania, Malaysia, New Zealand, Singapore, and the United States. "Good Days" was met with critical acclaim and was nominated for Best R&B Song at the 64th Annual Grammy Awards.

== Background and release ==
SZA first teased the song on July 15, 2020, via her Instagram stories. "Good Days" was originally featured at the tail end of the music video for "Hit Different", released in September 2020, leading to speculation among listeners that it would serve as a B-side to that single. On October 21, 2020, SZA explained that the song was "in clearance" for release. A week before release, she confirmed the track to come out before 2021. The song was eventually released as a surprise drop on Christmas Day 2020.

== Music and lyrics ==
From 2017 to the first half of 2019, recording for SZA's second album, SOS (2022) happened sporadically. She had been going on tour during those years, only finding the time to record when she felt like it. In the two-year touring period, she recorded the lead single "Good Days" in 2018 with Lang at her Malibu house, following a guitar and drums demo from Los Hendrix and Nascent one year prior. SZA started writing the song during a session on Lang's birthday that year and "finished it randomly" in 2020.

"Good Days" is an alternative R&B and alternative pop song. Dubbed a "nostalgic track", "Good Days" sees SZA singing about "former love, soul searching, and rejoicing carefreely" over "guitar-tinged riff plays", while she makes use of her "dreamy vocals". Compared to its predecessor, the song "manages to hit much more of a melodic, narrative-driven tone that puts it more in line with her Ctrl output".

The ascending tone inserted at the end of the song is an easter egg of Jacob Collier's song "In Too Deep".

== Commercial performance ==
After its release in late–December 2020, "Good Days" peaked within the top 10 of the Billboard Global 200 in January. It was SZA's first song to chart in the top 10 on the chart, and it did so in January 2021, with 32.3 million international streams and 4000 digital copies.

In the United States, "Good Days" debuted on the Billboard Hot 100 at number 38 dated on January 9, 2021. The song later reached a new peak at number 9 on the Hot 100; it became SZA's first top-10 entry in a lead credit and her third overall, following "What Lovers Do" (Note: 2017 collaboration with Maroon 5) and "All the Stars". (Note: 2018 collaboration with Kendrick Lamar) On Hot R&B/Hip-Hop Songs, "Good Days" marked SZA's second top 5 entry, after "All the Stars". On Billboard airplay charts, it entered on R&B/Hip-Hop Airplay, Rhythmic, and the pop-driven Mainstream Top 40, with peaks of 23, 16, and 33, respectively. In July 2026, the song was certified diamond by the Recording Industry Association of America (RIAA) for sales of over ten million equivalent units.

"Good Days" debuted on multiple singles charts worldwide. It peaked at number 3 in New Zealand, and number 8 in Ireland and Singapore. The song reached the top 10 in Lithuania and was the eighth most streamed international song in Malaysia for a week. It became SZA's third top-10 entry in Australia and was certified quadruple platinum for selling over 280,000 units.

== Live performances ==
SZA included "Good Days" regularly during the SOS Tour, which ran from 2023 to 2024. It was performed for the concerts' encore. SZA concluded the shows on a diving board prop onstage, as the screen projected a scene of the sun either rising or setting. She also performed the song as part of the Grand National Tour, which she co-headlined with rapper Kendrick Lamar, starting in April 2025. Concerts were divided into nine acts; SZA performed "Good Days" during the seventh.

== Accolades ==
Critical rankings for "Good Days"
Publication	Accolade	Rank	Ref.
Pitchfork	The 100 Best Songs of 2021	20	
Pitchfork	The 100 Best Songs of the 2020s So Far	67	

Awards and nominations for "Good Days"
Year	Organization	Award	Result	Ref(s)
2021	MTV Video Music Awards	Best R&B	Nominated	
2022	Grammy Awards	Best R&B Song	Nominated	

== Music videos ==
Two music videos were released for "Good Days". Both videos were directed by SZA.

=== Official fan video ===
On January 13, 2021, SZA tweeted a request for fans to submit videos of their "happiest, saddest, [and] YOUR UGLIEST moments" to an email address, with a deadline of Saturday at midnight. The fan video was released on February 10, 2021, and featured a compilation of videos submitted by fans lip-syncing to the song as well as featuring the aforementioned moments intercut with behind-the-scenes footage of the official video.

=== Music video ===
On March 5, 2021, the official music video was released. The video takes place with SZA experiencing a mushroom-induced psychedelic experience. It features scenes of SZA dancing while buried waist up in an oversized Alice in Wonderland-inspired garden and pole-dancing in a library. Jacob Collier cameos in the video as the man within the green television. In a similar fashion to the video for "Hit Different", the video ends with a teaser of "Shirt" and features SZA pole-dancing at an empty gas station while bathed in pink lighting.

== Credits ==
Recording and management

- Recorded at SZA's house (Malibu, California)

Personnel

- Solána Rowe (SZA) – vocals, songwriting
- Carter Lang – songwriting, production
- Christopher Ruelas (Nascent) – songwriting, production
- Carlos Munoz (Los Hendrix) – songwriting, production
- Jacob Collier (Note: Contributed uncredited vocals) – songwriting, background vocals
- Rob Bisel – vocal production, recording
- Shawn Everett – mixing, mastering
- Joe Visciano – vocal mixing
- Dale Becker – mastering
- Katie Harvey – assistant mastering
- Noah McCorkle – assistant mastering

== Charts ==
=== Weekly charts ===
Weekly chart performance for "Good Days"
Chart (2021)	Peak position
Australia (ARIA)	7
Austria (Ö3 Austria Top 40)	73
Belgium (Ultratip Bubbling Under Flanders)	2
Belgium (Ultratip Bubbling Under Wallonia)	42
Canada Hot 100 (Billboard)	12
Denmark (Tracklisten)	24
Finland Radio (Suomen virallinen radiolistasijoitus)	19
Finland Streaming (Suomen virallinen striimilistasijoitus)	3
France (SNEP)	174
Global 200 (Billboard)	7
Iceland (Tónlistinn)	14
Ireland (IRMA)	8
Lithuania (AGATA)	10
Malaysia (RIM)	8
Netherlands (Dutch Top 40 Tipparade)	9
Netherlands (Single Top 100)	39
New Zealand (Recorded Music NZ)	3
Norway (VG-lista)	15
Portugal (AFP)	30
Singapore (RIAS)	8
Slovakia (Singles Digitál Top 100)	56
Sweden (Sverigetopplistan)	26
Switzerland (Schweizer Hitparade)	39
UK Singles (Official Charts)	13
UK Hip Hop/R&B (Official Charts)	5
US Billboard Hot 100	9
US Hot R&B/Hip-Hop Songs (Billboard)	3
US R&B/Hip-Hop Airplay (Billboard)	23
US Pop Airplay (Billboard)	33
US Rhythmic Airplay (Billboard)	16

=== Year-end charts ===
Year-end chart performance for "Good Days"
Chart (2021)	Position
Australia (ARIA)	36
Canada (Canadian Hot 100)	67
Global 200 (Billboard)	78
Iceland (Tónlistinn)	42
New Zealand (Recorded Music NZ)	24
Portugal (AFP)	157
UK Singles (OCC)	90
US Billboard Hot 100	52
US Hot R&B/Hip-Hop Songs (Billboard)	21

== Certifications ==
Certifications and sales for "Good Days"
Region	Certification	Certified units/sales
Australia (ARIA)	4× Platinum	280,000^{‡}
Brazil (Pro-Música Brasil)	Diamond	160,000^{‡}
Canada (Music Canada)	7× Platinum	560,000^{‡}
Denmark (IFPI Danmark)	Gold	45,000^{‡}
France (SNEP)	Platinum	200,000^{‡}
New Zealand (RMNZ)	6× Platinum	180,000^{‡}
Poland (ZPAV)	Gold	25,000^{‡}
Portugal (AFP)	Platinum	10,000^{‡}
Spain (Promusicae)	Gold	30,000^{‡}
United Kingdom (BPI)	2× Platinum	1,200,000^{‡}
United States (RIAA)	Diamond	10,000,000^{‡}
Streaming
Sweden (GLF)	Gold	4,000,000^{†}
^{‡} Sales+streaming figures based on certification alone.^{†} Streaming-only figures based on certification alone.

== Release history ==
Release dates for "Good Days"
Region	Date	Format(s)	Label	Ref.
Various	December 25, 2020	Digital download; streaming	RCA	
United States	January 12, 2021	Urban adult contemporary	RCA	
Italy	January 29, 2021	Radio airplay	Sony	
