= Getter discography =

- Studio albums: 2
- EPs: 13
- Singles: 19

This is the discography of American DJ Getter.

== Studio albums ==
Title	Details
I Want More	Released: 5 February 2013; Label: Firepower; Format: Digital download
Visceral	Released: 28 September 2018; Label: mau5trap; Format: Digital download, vinyl

== Extended plays ==
Title	Details	Peak chart positions	
Title	Details	US Dance	US Heat
Extermination	Released: 11 April 2011; Label: Ultragore Recordings; Format: Digital download	—	—
Gruesome	Released: 1 August 2011; Label: Ultragore Recordings; Format: Digital download	—	—
Epidemic	Released: 4 May 2012; Label: BroTown; Format: Digital download	—	—
Psycho	Released: 26 June 2012; Label: Firepower; Format: Digital download	—	—
Swine	Released: 6 August 2012; Label: Rottun Recordings; Format: Digital download	—	—
Thriller	Released: 17 December 2013; Label: Firepower; Format: Digital download	—	—
Gnar	Released: 5 June 2013; Label: None; Format: Digital download	—	—
Smasher	Released: 9 July 2013; Label: Firepower; Format: Digital download	—	—
Inner Workings	Released: 9 December 2014; Label: Firepower; Format: Digital download	—	—
Allegiance	Released: 16 June 2015; Label: Owsla; Format: Digital download	—	—
Radical Dude!	Released: 11 March 2016; Label: OWSLA; Format: Digital download	5	17
Wat the Frick	Released: 2 September 2016; Label: OWSLA; Format: Digital download	7	8
Dahlia I (with Ghostemane)	Released: 28 February 2018; Label: Shred Collective / Blackmage; Format: Digital download	—	—
Napalm	Released: 30 October 2020; Label: Shred Collective; Format: Digital download	—	—
DOOM	Released: 30 January 2026; Label: Bassrush Records; Format: Digital download	—	—
DOOM 2	Released: 17 April 2026; Label: Bassrush Records; Format: Digital download	—	—
"—" denotes a recording that did not chart or was not released.

== Singles ==
Title	Year	Album
"Vile Orchestra"	2011	Non-album singles
"Berzerker"	2012	Non-album singles
"Fallout"	2014	I Want More
"Head Splitter"	2015	Non-album singles
"World" (featuring Ookay)	2015	Non-album singles
"666!"	2016	Radical Dude!
"Suh Dude"	2016	Non-album single
"Wat the Frick"	2016	Wat the Frick
"Inhalant Abuse"	2017	Non-album singles
"The Otha Side" (as Terror Reid)	2017	Non-album singles
"Who Dat" (as Terror Reid)	2017	Non-album singles
"Fuck Everybody" (as Terror Reid)	2017	Non-album singles
"Stormin the Gatez" (as Terror Reid)	2017	Non-album singles
"Bury Me" (with Ghostemane)	2017	Non-album singles
"Inhalant Abuse VIP"	2017	Non-album singles
"Solo" (with Party Nails)	2017	Visceral
"Big Mouth"	2017	Non-album singles
"Dead To Me" (as Terror Reid)	2017	Non-album singles
"Colorblind"	2018	Visceral
"Made For You (Alone Again)"	2018	Visceral
"Ham Sandwich"	2019	Non-album singles
"Never Change" (with HvrdLxck)	2019	Non-album singles
"Heartless"	2019	Non-album singles
"Represent"	2020	Non-album singles

== SoundCloud discography ==
Year	Title
2014	Getter - SHAPOW!
2014	Destroid - Activation (Getter Remix)
2015	Scroobius Pip - The Struggle (Doctor P Remix) Getter and AFK VIP
2015	Borgore - Last Year (Getter Remix)
2015	Head Splitter
2015	spooky black - reason (getter remix)
2015	Major Lazer and DJ Snake - Lean On featuring MØ (Getter Remix)
2015	Getter and MUST DIE! - Mega Gun
2015	Getter - Low Tide (featuring Jaden)
2016	Getter - Genocide (featuring Dahn Farro)
2016	Getter - High Tide
2016	Pouya X Fat Nick - Hunnit Hunnit (Prod. By Getter)
2016	Introduction
2016	Altitude (Thesis Statement)
2016	Beach Cruiser
2016	Soulmother, I Love You (featuring Tree)
2016	Realizations (Interlude)
2016	Glide To Beyond
2016	Told You (featuring Ookay)
2016	Every Bit Of My All (featuring Tree)
2016	Weekend (featuring Tree)
2016	Pouya - Get Buck (Getter's Hydra Mix)
2016	Jauz and Pegboard Nerds - Get On Up (Getter Remix)
2016	Jack Ü - Febreze featuring 2 Chainz (Getter Remix)
2016	Metronome Mix #50
2016	Bear Grillz and Getter - EDM (VIP)
2016	Banvox - Summer (Getter Remix)
2016	Brillz and Ghastly - Hawt (Getter Remix)
2016	Barely Alive - Windpipe featuring Ragga Twins (Getter Remix)
2016	Genocide (featuring Dahn Farro)
2016	High Tide
2016	Mega Gun
2016	Forget It (featuring Oliver Tree)
2016	Getter - Ode 2 Phife
2016	Low Tide (featuring Jaden)
2016	Rip N Dip
2016	Back
2016	Getter - Wat The Frick
2016	2 High (featuring Suicideboys)
2016	Marshmello - Alone (Getter Remix)
2016	Something New
2016	Wat The Frick (VIP Mix)
2016	Cool as Frick
2016	Fricken Dope
2016	Hecka Tight
2016	Sick Jet Pack Bro
2017	phantom of tha opera
2017	love me no more
2017	tourettes squad
2017	cruisin (featuring Nick Colletti)
2017	money a do it flip
2017	feel
2017	moonshine ft andy milonakis
2017	Getter and Ghastly - 666! (Getter VIP)
2017	Pink Guy X Getter X Nick Colletti - Hood Rich
2017	Getter - Diplo and Friends Mix
2017	GTA x Wax Motif - Get It All (Getter and Ray Volpe Remix)
2017	Getter Ultra 2017 Mix
2017	Pink Guy - Fried Noodles (Getter Remix)
2017	Getter - Inhalant Abuse
2017	Getter and Ghostmane - Bury Me
