= Aasis Beats =

Nepalese songwriter and producer (born 1996)

- Born: Aasis Giri; August 17, 1996 (age 29); Kathmandu, Nepal
- Genres: Hip hop; trap; indie pop; lofi; R&B
- Occupations: Producer; sample maker; songwriter
- Instruments: Guitar; keyboards; piano
- Years active: 2018-present
- Website: aasisbeats.com

Aasis Giri, professionally known as Aasis Beats, is a Nepalese record producer, songwriter, and sample maker from Kathmandu, Nepal. He is the first music producer from Nepal who has productions that have charted at number one on the Billboard charts. Aasis's samples have been the melodic foundation for hit songs for Central Cee, Lil Baby, Suicideboys, Dave East, Sofaygo and more. He worked with Suicideboys to co-produce their first number one charting album, New World Depression. He also worked with rapper Central Cee and Lil Baby to co-produce their 2024 hit song "Band4Band", and collaborated with Tommy Richman to produce the lead single "Thought You Were the One" from Richman's debut album, coyote.

Aasis has contributed to connecting the Nepali music scene with the global hip-hop industry through a combination of technical production work and collaborations with artists from different regions, he has received Diamond and Gold certifications, appeared on Billboard charts, and worked with several well-known hip-hop artists, making him a notable music producer from South Asia.

== Early life ==
Aasis Giri was born on August 17, 1996, in Kathmandu, Nepal. He began producing at the age of 17, he cites Nick Mira, Metro Boomin, Drake, Juice Wrld & Noah 40 as an influence. Aasis describes his musical style as "synthetic", "melodic" and "nostalgic". Spending countless days and nights in front of his laptop producing music on FL Studio, Giri, more widely known as Aasis Beats in the music industry, immersed himself in the art of sample making and music production.

== Career ==
While Aasis began his producing career by selling beats online, he noticed that making samples might give him more opportunity so he started uploading loops and samples on Looperman.

In 2024, he got his first major placement in Central Cee's Lil Baby-assisted single "Band4Band", Giri created a loop several years ago that would later find its way into the hit song, Giri had nearly forgotten about the loop when it was unexpectedly picked up by Central Cee’s producers. The song went on to make waves, landing at number 18 on the US Billboard Hot 100, number 12 on the Billboard Global 200, and number 1 on UK Hip Hop/R&B Official Charts. Currently, the song has over 300 Million streams on Spotify and over 100 Million streams on YouTube. The record is also RIAA Certified Platinum in the US, selling over 1 million units. It also went platinum in Canada and Gold on United Kingdom.

Later that year, Aasis began working with the American hip-hop duo Suicideboys on their album New World Depression, which charted at number one on Billboard's Top R&B/Hip-Hop Albums chart. The album also reached number one on the Billboard US Independent Albums chart and number 5 on the US Billboard 200.

Aasis Beats also produced the hit single "Chandigarh Ka Chokra" for Indian singer and actress Sunanda Sharma, which peaked at number 35 on Asian Music Chart. The song currently has over 50 million streams on Spotify and over 40 million views on YouTube.

Later in his career, Aasis Beats collaborated with Million Dollar Baby artist Tommy Richman to produce the lead single, "THOUGHT YOU WERE THE ONE" from Richman's debut album Coyote. The album peaked at number 10 on the US Heatseekers Albums (Billboard).

Aasis Beats reached a career milestone in 2025 by producing the hit single “AVM” for French artist YG Pablo. The track earned a Diamond certification from the Syndicat National de l'Édition Phonographique (SNEP) in France.

== Production discography ==
Year	Title	Primary Artist(s)	Featuring Artist(s)	Label(s)
2018	Heartbreak	SadBoyProlific , Kuzu Mellow	N/A	N/A
2019	Devil Fruit	SoFaygo	N/A	Cactus Jack
2019	White Wedding	Doobie	N/A	SCFMG Music
2019	AVM	YG Pablo	N/A	Art-east Inc
2019	Sandra	TOQUEL	N/A	Minos EMI SA/Universal Music Group
2019	UM Pedido	Hungria	N/A	Hungria Hip hop
2020	Satellites	Nicky Bondz	N/A	NGMG Group LLC
2020	Dubai Vibez	2Scratch	N/A	Purple Cloud
2020	Cloudy	Altair Blake	N/A	Den Haku Lofi
2020	Fly Away	Altair Blake	N/A	Den Haku Lofi
2020	Platinum	Rustage	Breeton Boi	N/A
2021	Never Had Shit	Dave East	Quany Gz	Def Jam Recordings
2021	Butterflies	2scratch	N/A	Purple Cloud
2021	Last Time	MO3	N/A	H$M Music/Empire
2021	Score	Arjan Dhillon	N/A	Brown Studios
2021	Otra Cama	Hard GZ	Dualy	BMG Rights Management Spain
2021	HONG KONG	Lvbel C5 & Batuflex	N/A	Universal Music Turkey
2022	B3ida	Kaso	N/A	N/A
2022	Go Getta	O Side Mafia	N/A	Sony Music Entertainment
2022	THATS IT	Sauce Walka	N/A	The Sauce Familia
2022	Vows	upchurch	Jelly Roll	Mud to Gold Entertainment
2023	Ana Out	Barhoom Maraawi	N/A	N/A
2023	How you wanna play It?	Bully Three	Boosie Badazz	Yung Flyy Music
2023	Wild n Rich	450, Weekday	N/A	Tru Ambassador Next Generation
2023	Chandigarh Ka Chokra	Sunanda Sharma	N/A	Warner Music/Sky Digital
2023	Self Esteem	ACE COOL	N/A	EVOEL STUDIO
2023	Hasdi	Jassa Dhillon, Prodgk	N/A	Jassa Dhillon Productions
2023	Takis & Prime	ClashGames	KleinerJunge & KleinerMax	recordJet
2024	180	SHUWU	N/A	N/A
2024	US Vs. Them	Suicideboys	N/A	G59 Records
2024	BAND4BAND	Central Cee	Lil Baby	Columbia Records
2024	The Thin Grey Line	Suicideboys	N/A	G59 Records
2024	New World Depression	Suicideboys	N/A	G59 Records
2024	Thought You Were the One	Tommy Richman	N/A	Universal Music Group ISO Supremacy Pulse
2025	Soulja	Fredo Bang & TEC	N/A	N/A
2025	Grim Reaper	Fredo Bang & TEC	Kevin Gates	N/A
2025	WHO WANT WAR	Mozzy	Polo G	Mozzy Records/Empire
2025	SEVEN 2's	Mozzy	N/A	Mozzy Records/Empire
2025	Instinto	J Abdiel	El Clooy & Kris R	Unstoppable Bookingz
2026	YOU HEAR ME THO	Mozzy & EST Gee	N/A	Mozzy Records, Empire, Young Shiners LLC
2026	WOULDN'T HOLD YOU UP	Mozzy & EST Gee	N/A	Mozzy Records, Empire, Young Shiners LLC
