= Coyote (Tommy Richman album) =

2024 studio album by Tommy Richman

Studio album by Tommy Richman
- Released: September 27, 2024
- Genres: R&B; pop rap; funk; synth-pop; dance-pop
- Length: 36:44
- Labels: ISO Supremacy; PULSE
- Producers: 1stfrom92; Aasis Beats; Kavi; Keesh; Lim0; MannyVelli; Tommy Richman; Jonah Roy; Spizz; Max Vossberg; Curtis Waters; John Wehmeyer

Tommy Richman chronology
| The Rush (2023) | Coyote (2024) | Worlds Apart (2025) |

Singles from Coyote
- 1. "Thought You Were the One" Released: August 30, 2024; 2. "Whitney" Released: September 20, 2024

Coyote (stylized in all caps) is the debut studio album by American singer-songwriter Tommy Richman, released on September 27, 2024, through ISO Supremacy and PULSE Records. The album features guest appearances from Trevor Spitta, Zachary Moon, Paco and Mynameisntjmack, while the production was primarily handled by Richman himself alongside John Wehmeyer, Jonah Roy, and Lim0 with support from 1stform92 and MannyVelli. The album serves as a follow-up to Richman's third EP, The Rush (2023).

Coyote was supported by two singles: "Thought You Were the One" and "Whitney". Richman released the internationally charting singles "Million Dollar Baby" and "Devil Is a Lie" prior to the album's release, although neither were included on the track list.

== Release and promotion ==
On August 21, 2023, Richman signed a joint venture record deal between Brent Faiyaz's ISO Supremacy and PULSE Records. On November 8, 2023, Richman announced the album to be released in 2024. On April 26, 2024, Richman released his viral breakthrough single, "Million Dollar Baby" which peaked at number two on the Billboard Hot 100 and atop the Billboard Global 200. The single was followed by the release of "Devil Is a Lie" which also performed well commercially, peaking at number 32 and 37 on the Billboard Hot 100 and Billboard Global 200, respectively.

Richman's interview with Billboard was released on June 4, appearing in the June 8, 2024, edition of the magazine. On June 17, Richman shared exclusive photos from his photoshoot with Billboard alongside officially announcing the album. On August 30, Richman released the album's lead single, "Thought You Were the One". The album's second single, "Whitney" was released on September 20. On September 24, Richman released the album's official tracklist, revealing that the hit singles, "Million Dollar Baby" and "Devil Is a Lie" were cut from the final tracklist, despite performing well commercially at the time of the album's release.

== Track listing ==
Coyote track listing
| No. | Title | Writer(s) | Producers | Length |
|---|---|---|---|---|
| 1. | "Elephant in the Room" | Tommy Richman; Jonah Roy | Richman; Roy | 2:42 |
| 2. | "Whitney" | Richman; Roy | Roy; John Wehmeyer; Lim0 | 2:44 |
| 3. | "Temptations" | Richman; Roy; Keshon Duke; Grace Robertson | Roy; Keesh | 3:19 |
| 4. | "Whisper in My Ear" | Richman; Roy | Richman; Roy; Wehmeyer; Lim0; Kavi | 2:40 |
| 5. | "Give it All" | Richman; Roy; Albert Hudson | Roy; Wehmeyer; Lim0; Kavi | 3:09 |
| 6. | "Tennessee" (with Trevor Spitta and Zachary Moon) | Richman; Trevor Spitaletta; Zachary Moon; Roy | Richman; Roy; Mannyvelli | 2:33 |
| 7. | "Thought You Were the One" | Richman; Roy | Richman; Aasis Beats; Roy; Lim0; MannyVelli; 1stfrom92 | 2:58 |
| 8. | "Letterman" (with Paco) | Richman; Roman Ortiz; Roy | Richman; Roy | 2:40 |
| 9. | "Green Therapy" | Richman; Roy | Roy; Kavi; Maverick Fabela | 3:07 |
| 10. | "Vanity" | Richman; Roy | Richman; Roy; Max Vossberg; Spizz | 6:14 |
| 11. | "Seems Like Time Moves Forever." (with Mynameisntjmack) | Richman; Jonathan Mack; Roy | Richman; Roy; Vossberg; Curtis Waters | 4:35 |
| Total length: | | | | 36:44 |

Notes

- All tracks are stylized in all caps in exception of "Seems Like Times Moves Forever.", whom is stylized in lowercase

== Personnel ==
Credits adapted from Tidal.

- Tommy Richman – vocals (all tracks), synthesizer (track 1), drums (4, 7, 8, 11), keyboards (4, 7, 8), flute (6)
- Jonah Roy – engineering (all tracks), bass guitar (1, 2, 4–8, 10, 11), drums (1, 2, 5, 6, 8, 10, 11), keyboards (1, 2, 5, 7, 8, 10), synthesizer (9)
- Itai Schwartz – mixing, mastering
- Lim0 – drums (2, 4, 5, 7)
- John Wehmeyer – synthesizer (2), drums (4), guitar (5)
- Kavi – synthesizer (5)
- MannyVelli – drums (6, 7)
- Trevor Spitta – vocals (6)
- Zachary Moon – vocals (6)
- 1stfrom92 – drums (7)
- Paco – vocals (8)
- Maverick Fabela – bass guitar, drums, guitar, keyboards (9)
- Spizz – drums (10)
- Max Vossberg – guitar (10, 11)
- Curtis Waters – keyboards (11)
- Mynameisntjmack – vocals (11)

== Charts ==
Chart performance for Coyote
| Chart (2024) | Peak position |
|---|---|
| US Heatseekers Albums (Billboard) | 10 |
