= Ham sandwich (disambiguation) =

A ham sandwich is a common type of sandwich.

Ham sandwich may also refer to:

- Ham Sandwich (band), an Irish indie rock band
- "Ham Sandwich" (song), by Getter, 2019
- "Ham Sandwich", a 1963 short story by James H. Schmitz
- Ham sandwich theorem, a mathematical result
