= I Want More =

I Want More may refer to:

- I Want More (film), a 1976 film featuring Hong Kong actor Peter Yang
- "I Want More" (Can song), a 1976 song by Can
- I Want More (album), a live album by Dexter Gordon recorded in 1964 and released in 1980
- I Want More (Getter album), 2013
- I Want More (EP), a 1992 EP by Shotgun Messiah
- "I Want More" (Faithless song), a 2004 song by Faithless
- "I Want More", a song by Chumbawamba on their album Tubthumper
- "I Want More", a song by Suburban Legends on their self-titled EP
- "I Want More", a song from the musical Lestat
