= Acting Up =

Acting Up may refer to:

== Film and TV ==
- Acting Up (1978) Marlena Shaw
- Acting Up, episode of Make Me a Supermodel (season 1)
- Acting Up, episode of Trapped (Australian TV series)
- Acting Up" (Season 1, Episode 9) Living Lohan Lindsay Lohan 2008

== Music ==
- "Acting Up", song by Kaiser Chiefs from Good Days Bad Days
- "Actin Up", song by Tommy Richman
- "Actin' Up", song by Maybach Music Group from Self Made Vol. 2
- "Actin' Up", song by Asher Roth, Rye Rye, Chris Brown, Justin Bieber discography The Greenhouse Effect Vol. 2 2013
- "Actin' Up", song by Miranda Lambert from Palomino.

== Other uses ==
- Acting up, a variant of the psychological term "acting out", relating to (often) anti-social behaviour
