= I Want to Die in New Orleans =

Studio album by Suicideboys
- Released: September 7, 2018
- Recorded: 2016–2018
- Genres: Trap music; hardcore hip-hop; Memphis rap; cloud rap
- Labels: G*59; Caroline
- Producers: Budd Dwyer; Juicy J; ThizzmanBeatz

Suicideboys chronology
Kill Yourself Part XX: The Infinity Saga (2017)	I Want to Die in New Orleans (2018)	Live Fast, Die Whenever (2019)

Suicideboys studio album chronology
I Want to Die in New Orleans (2018)	Long Term Effects of Suffering (2021)

Singles from I Want to Die in New Orleans
- 1. "Carrollton" Released: August 1, 2018; 2. "Meet Mr. Niceguy" Released: August 24, 2018

I Want to Die in New Orleans is the debut studio album by American hip-hop duo Suicideboys, which was released on September 7, 2018, by Caroline Distribution and Suicideboys' imprint G*59 Records. The album genres consists of trap and hardcore hip-hop, alongside elements of Memphis rap and cloud rap. The album chronicles semi-autobiographical stories of the duo's encounters with depression, drug addiction and suicidal ideation. Released to critical acclaim in the underground rap scene, the album debuted at number 9 on the US Billboard 200 with 49,000 album-equivalent units in its first week sales. The album also reached the top 10 in Australia and Finland.

== Background ==
Originally titled I Don't Want to Die in New Orleans, the album was first teased by Suicideboys in a February 2017 tweet from member $crim, announcing a December 2017 release date for what would become their debut studio album. They later reaffirmed this in an interview with XXL in April 2017.

The recording for I Want to Die in New Orleans began in 2016 whilst the duo were on tour.

== Music and lyrics ==
I Want to Die in New Orleans was released on September 7, 2018, and is 14 tracks long with its last song, "I No Longer Fear the Razor Blade Guarding My Heel (IV)", acting as the fourth iteration of the duo's popular EP series of the same name. The project chronicles semi-autobiographical stories of the duo's encounters with depression, drug addiction and suicidal ideation. The instrumentals used are often ominous, dark but clean and feature samples from news adverts, local PSAs and documentaries taken in the New Orleans area in the late 90s as a way to attempt to create an atmospheric feel.

The project only has one feature on "Fuck the Industry", which is uncredited, but involves rapper Bones speaking a mock eulogy. All tracks are produced by Suicideboys member $crim, under his producer alias Budd Dwyer. "I No Longer Fear the Razor Blade Guarding My Heel (IV)" contains a guitar interlude by fellow Suicideboys member Ruby da Cherry, and "Phanton Menace" was co-produced by Memphis rapper and mentor Juicy J.

== Critical reception ==
HipHopDX gave the album a rating of 3.9 out of 5, commenting "...have they actually changed the world of music itself? It's possible to chalk it up to typical artist bravado, but after yet another well-received release, they certainly have the evidence to argue their case."

== Commercial performance ==
Released to critical acclaim in the underground rap scene, the album debuted at number 9 on the US Billboard 200 with 49,000 units in its first week sales making it their first US top 10 album. The album also reached the top 10 in Australia and Finland.

== Track listing ==
All tracks are written by Aristos Petrou and Scott Arceneaux Jr., except for "Fuck the Industry", co-written with Elmo Kennedy O'Connor. All tracks are produced by Budd Dwyer, except where listed.

No.	Title	Producer(s)	Length
1.	"King Tulip"		3:05
2.	"Bring Out Your Dead"		1:46
3.	"Nicotine Patches"		2:36
4.	"10,000 Degrees"		3:09
5.	"122 Days"		3:04
6.	"Phanton Menace"	Budd Dwyer; Juicy J	2:22
7.	"Krewe du Vieux (Comedy & Tragedy)"		1:44
8.	"War Time All the Time"		2:25
9.	"Coma"		2:17
10.	"Long Gone (Save Me from This Hell)"		2:18
11.	"Meet Mr. Niceguy"	Budd Dwyer; ThizzmanBeatz	2:26
12.	"Carrollton"		3:23
13.	"Fuck the Industry"		3:55
14.	"I No Longer Fear the Razor Guarding My Heel (IV)": "No Salivation for the Promise of Salvation"; "Try Howling at the Moon While Being Strangled"; "Missed My Cue for Curtain Call"	Budd Dwyer; Slamdunkasaur	7:54
Total length:			42:29

Sample credits

- "Coma" contains samples of "Much Better Off" by Smokey Robinson and the Miracles, "Kreepin' Out Da Kut" by Playa Fly, and "Fall Up Off Me Ho" by Indo G
- "King Tulip" contains a sample of "Cuesta Blanca" by Grupo Encuentro
- "10,000 Degrees" contains a sample from "Thinkin' of a Driveby" by Gimisum Family
- "I No Longer Fear The Razor Guarding My Heel (IV)" contains a sample of "Nine To Your Dome" by Three 6 Mafia

== Charts ==
Chart (2018)	Peak position
Australian Albums (ARIA)	10
Belgian Albums (Ultratop Flanders)	44
Belgian Albums (Ultratop Wallonia)	162
Canadian Albums (Billboard)	26
Dutch Albums (Album Top 100)	74
Finnish Albums (Suomen virallinen lista)	6
German Albums (Offizielle Top 100)	89
New Zealand Albums (RMNZ)	15
Norwegian Albums (VG-lista)	36
Swiss Albums (Schweizer Hitparade)	87
UK R&B Albums (Official Charts)	31
US Billboard 200	9

== Certifications ==
Region	Certification	Certified units/sales
United States (RIAA)	Gold	500,000^{‡}
^{‡} Sales+streaming figures based on certification alone.
