= Us vs. Them =

2024 single by Suicideboys

Single by Suicideboys

from the album New World Depression
- Released: March 29, 2024
- Genre: Hip hop
- Length: 3:04
- Label: G*59
- Songwriters: Scott Arceneaux Jr.; Aristos Petrou
- Producer: Budd Dwyer

Suicideboys singles chronology
"Big Shot Cream Soda" (2024)	"Us vs. Them" (2024)	"Are You Going to See the Rose in the Vase, or the Dust on the Table" (2024)

"Us vs. Them" is a song by American hip hop duo Suicideboys, released on March 29, 2024, as the lead single from their fourth studio album, New World Depression (2024). It is their first song to chart on the Billboard Hot 100, debuting and peaking at number 96.

== Composition and critical reception ==
Tom Breihan of Stereogum described the song as "vintage $uicideboy$: creepy flickering beat, evil singsong nursery-rhyme hooks, lyrics about chewing fentanyl and snorting percocet. It's directly inspired by '90s underground rap, of both the backpack and the Southern mixtape varieties, and it's effective on both fronts." Revolver called it an "eerie, lysergic cut".

== Charts ==
Chart performance for "Us vs. Them"
Chart (2024)	Peak position
Canada Hot 100 (Billboard)	85
New Zealand Hot Singles (RMNZ)	7
US Billboard Hot 100	96
US Hot R&B/Hip-Hop Songs (Billboard)	26

== Certifications ==
Region	Certification	Certified units/sales
New Zealand (RMNZ)	Gold	15,000^{‡}
^{‡} Sales+streaming figures based on certification alone.
