= Antarctica (song) =

2016 single by Suicideboys

Single by Suicideboys

from the album Dark Side of the Clouds
- Released: January 26, 2016
- Genre: Emo rap; cloud rap
- Length: 2:06
- Label: G*59
- Songwriters: Scott Arceneaux Jr.; Aristos Petrou; Finn Bjarnson; Ryan Raddon; Joel Zimmerman
- Producer: Budd Dwyer

Suicideboys singles chronology
| "Paris" (2015) | "Antarctica" (2016) | "Kill Yourself (Part IV)" (2016) |

"Antarctica" is a song by American hip hop duo Suicideboys, released on January 26, 2016 the lead single from their mixtape Dark Side of the Clouds (2016). It samples parts of "I Remember" by producers and DJs Deadmau5 and Kaskade.

== Controversy ==
In September 2016, Deadmau5 accused Suicideboys of copyright infringement and claimed that they were "publicizing other people's intellectual property without consent". The song was removed from YouTube and SoundCloud, but the sample was eventually cleared years later, after which "Antarctica" was re-released to streaming services on September 3, 2021.

== Certifications ==
Certifications for "Antarctica"
| Region | Certification | Certified units/sales |
|---|---|---|
| United States (RIAA) | Platinum | 1,000,000^{‡} |
^{‡} Sales+streaming figures based on certification alone.

== Samples ==
The song consists of a construction kit Crate Vinyl Collection 5 by Big Citi Loops.
