= Visceral (album) =

Studio album by Getter
- Released: September 28, 2018
- Genre: Experimental; bass; hip-hop
- Length: 54:39
- Label: Mau5trap
- Producer: Tanner Petulla

Getter chronology
Wat the Frick (2016)	Visceral (2018)

Singles from Visceral
- 1. "Solo" Released: October 20, 2017; 2. "Colorblind" Released: February 7, 2018; 3. "All Is Lost" Released: July 13, 2018; 4. "Made For You (Alone Again)" Released: September 5, 2018

Visceral (stylized in all caps) is the debut studio album by American DJ and record producer Getter. It was released on September 28, 2018, via Mau5trap. Featuring collaborators such as Audio Opera, Allan Kingdom, Nothing,Nowhere, Sweetsound, Midoca, Name UL, Njomza, Party Nails and Joji, the album consists of twelve songs.

== Background ==
On Twitter, Getter provided an explanation of meanings for each song in the album beginning from August 11 to 21, 2018. The next day, he revealed the track listing of the album via Twitter, sharing an artwork of handwritten song titles. It was initially planned for a release in July but due to unapproved samples, the album's release had undergone multiple postponements and was eventually announced for September. Getter tweeted that the album's release is "99% confirmed in September. just finishing some contracts." Getter's releasing with Mau5trap became fruitful after one of his future bass songs was included on the label's Mau5ville: Level 1 EP.

== Composition ==
Visceral incorporates elements of hip-hop, electronic, bass and rock, with songs varying in the styles from future bass to funk and from rap to ambient. The album is described as "filled with dark, moving material" and it "doesn't shy away from life's roughest truths." The second half of the album is noted for getting "progressively lighter and more upbeat after the breakdown in Colorblind." Among the singles were "All Is Lost", "Made for You" and "Solo". The album is stylistically described as "ranging on the emotional spectrum from heartbreak and rejection to unhealthy relationships to the mental purgatory faced by being stuck in your own head" and a "personal deep dive into Getter's own life and tells a story of raw human emotions such as struggle, rejection, heartbreak and healing."

== Track listing ==
No.	Title	Length
1.	"Purgatory"	4:28
2.	"Part of Me" (featuring AudioOpera)	6:04
3.	"Numb" (featuring Allan Kingdom)	4:58
4.	"All Is Lost" (featuring Nothing,Nowhere)	5:06
5.	"Best of Me" (featuring Sweetsound)	3:43
6.	"Release" (featuring Midoca)	3:52
7.	"Colorblind" (Interlude)	3:10
8.	"Made for You (Alone Again)"	4:42
9.	"Bleed" (featuring Name UL)	2:48
10.	"Hold on Tight" (featuring Njomza)	4:32
11.	"Solo" (featuring Party Nails)	5:46
12.	"On My Way Out" (featuring Joji)	5:30
Total length:		54:39

== Charts ==
Chart (2018)	Peak position
US Top Dance Albums (Billboard)	18
