= Fat Juicy & Wet =

2025 single by Sexyy Red and Bruno Mars

Single by Sexyy Red and Bruno Mars
- Released: January 24, 2025
- Recorded: Glenwood Place Recording (Burbank); Beach Wave Sound (North Hollywood)
- Genre: Hyphy; Miami bass; electro-funk; dirty rap
- Length: 2:21
- Label: Rebel; Gamma; The Smeezingtons; Atlantic
- Songwriters: Janae Wherry; Bruno Mars; Jonathan Yip; Jeremy Reeves; Ray Romulus; Kameron Glasper
- Producers: The Stereotypes; Mars

Sexyy Red singles chronology
"Embrace It" (remix) (2024)	"Fat Juicy & Wet" (2025)	"Actin Up" (remix) (2025)

Bruno Mars singles chronology
"APT." (2024)	"Fat Juicy & Wet" (2025)	"Bonde do Brunão" (2025)

Music video
- "Fat Juicy & Wet" on YouTube

"Fat Juicy & Wet" (or the radio edit "Fat Juicy & ...") is a song by American rapper Sexyy Red and American singer-songwriter Bruno Mars. It was released on January 24, 2025, via digital download and streaming through Rebel Music, Gamma, the Smeezingtons under exclusive license to Atlantic Records. "Fat Juicy & Wet" is a hyphy, Miami bass, electro-funk and dirty rap strip club anthem.

The single mixes Red's "raunchy style" and Mars's "smooth, genre-crossing" voice. Critics gave "Fat Juicy & Wet" mixed reviews, with some criticizing the lack of "lyrical depth", while others complimented Mars for stepping out of his comfort zone. The song peaked at number 17 on the US Billboard Hot 100 and it reached the top forty in Canada, Chile, Japan, New Zealand and UK. The single found some moderate success on Hip Hop and R&B charts, mainly in the US.

The accompanying music video was directed by Mars himself alongside Daniel Ramos. In the video, set in red, both Red and Mars are seen flirting and celebrating with champagne bottles and soap bubbles. In a different scene, Mars mops a wet floor, while Red sits on an enormous couch. It is followed by their appreciation of a simulated boat ride. It also features cameos from Lady Gaga and Rosé, with the four artists dancing in matching black pant suits, opening champagne bottles, and lip-synching the chorus.

== Background ==
On January 22, 2025, Mars thanked his fans for keeping "Die with a Smile" (2024) at number one on the Billboard Hot 100. He announced that he was headed to the recording studio to "make a strip club anthem", asking if someone could help him contact Sexyy Red. The latter replied "You lookin for ah real bthc baby I'm right hur". Later, he shared a post on social media with the caption "Found Her" with Red and Mars, similar to how he announced his collaboration with Rosé.

He also teased a snippet of the untitled track, where you can hear Red saying, "Yeah! It's Sexyy, Hey Bruno!" In February 2025, during an interview for The Jennifer Hudson Show, Red clarified and revealed she wanted to work with Mars, so she contacted him. Once they were in contact, he took direction of the creative process, and she listened to his advice.

== Production and release ==
"Fat Juicy & Wet" was written by Janae Wherry, Mars, Jonathan Yip, Ray Romulus, Jeremy Reeves, and Kameron Glasper. The production was handled by Yip, Romulus, Reeves, and Mars, with the former three credited as the Stereotypes. Yip was in charge of the percussion, Reeves played the bass, and Romulus played the drums. All of them provided background vocals with Kameron Glasper. Charles Moniz, Kyle Kashiwagi, Rajon Brown, and Ronald "[RD]" Estrada recorded the track at Glenwood Place Studios in Burbank and Beach Wave Sound in North Hollywood. Alex Resoagli and Noah Damase served as the engineer assistants. The song was mixed at the latter studio by Kevin "K.D." Davis and mastered by Colin Leonard at the Singing Master in Atlanta.

"Fat Juicy & Wet" was released in various countries via digital download and streaming by Rebel, Gamma and the Smeezingtons under exclusive license to Atlantic Records. The single impacted Italian radio stations on the aforementioned date by Warner Music Italy. The track was issued on January 28, 2025 to rhythmic contemporary stations. The song started to be added to radios in New Zealand on February 7, 2025.

== Composition and lyrics ==
"Fat Juicy & Wet"
A 14-second sample of "Fat Juicy & Wet", where Mars sings the chorus and does his version of "visceral fuck-rap".

"Fat Juicy & Wet" is a hyphy, Miami bass and electro-funk strip club anthem. It is also a dirty rap track. The instrumental was called "snappy" and a "throwback". The single mixes Red's "raunchy style" and Mars's "smooth, genre-crossing" voice. He does his version of Red's "visceral fuck-rap". The song starts with an intro characteristic of "Mars's trademark airiness" as he sings the titular chorus, "Fat, juicy, and wet". He then proceeds to rap "that good kitty-kitty, good kitty-kitty/Make it my pet" and being "struck by "pussy so good" he wants "to throw up a set despite not gang banging." On her turn, Red "introduces a graphic rendition of the suggestive acts", such as "eating, dripping", and other various other sexual nuances. She keeps rapping a in "a sharp, streamlined" with "raunchy" lyrics, "Throw my legs back, eat my booty from the front/Milk mustache on your face when I cum" and "signing autographs in squirt juice".

== Critical reception ==
"Fat Juicy & Wet" received mixed reviews from music critics. Some criticized the lack of lyrical depth, while others praised Mars "for stepping out of his comfort zone". D'Souza, from Paper, dubbed the collaboration "a match made in heaven." In a later piece for The New York Times, he wrote the track was "dialing up the knowing greasiness" of the 24K Magic album and that it had a "playful hedonism". Stereogum's Tom Breihan commended the song on its songcraft, production, and utilization of "self-aware, silly raunchiness", writing that "the shock value is part of the fun". He also noticed the similarities between the single and "WAP" (2020) and considered the song a "blast". Elias Andrews, writing for HotNewHipHop, called the song "catchy" and "raunchy", praising Red's performance on the track and the "sweetness of the instrumental". Jessica Bennet, of Vibe, said the song was "reminiscent of late 2010's pop and hip-hop", with Mars the ideal artist for the song's "risqué hook". In a different review for the publication, however, Armon Sadler gave the song a mixed review. He commented on the song's fusion of Mars' "musicality and "slight penchant for vulgar lyrics", while also noting Red's "unfiltered raw sexuality". Despite issues with the lyrics, Sadler also noted the track has "an undeniable bounce", and that listeners "might be nodding and moving [their] shoulders without realizing it".

Jon Powell, writing for Revolt, dubbed the single an "infectious offering." Jonathan Morales, writing for The Miami Hurricane, praised the "infectiously poppy and electric bassline". Elaina Bernstein, of Hypebeast, expressed admiration for "the unexpected duo's surprising musical chemistry" The A.V. Club's Drew Gillis called the song "fun", despite some of Mars's verses being "jarring" and that Red's lyrics were "more delirious" than Mars' verses. Anna Kaufman, writing for USA Today, noted that unlike other Mars track like "Versace on the Floor" (2017) or "Please Me" (2019) with Cardi B, which "set the stage for their pairing", "Fat Juicy & Wet" had "no subtlety".

In a negative review, Alphonse Pierre of Pitchfork wrote that the song would "make you shut your laptop and sit in silence". Pierre negatively commented on the song's vocals, calling Mars' "fake-sexy speak-sing" and Red's as "like a parody of herself". Pierre unfavorably reviewed the track's execution of the concept together with its production, saying that Mars and the Stereotypes "slaughter the West Coast ratchet club sound" by giving it a "Las Vegas show tunes sheen". Joe Budden, an American broadcaster and former rapper, negatively reviewed the song on his eponymous Joe Budden Podcast. Budden compared Mars' change in lyrical style to "tactics employed by Donald Trump" to relate to black people.

== Commercial performance ==
"Fat Juicy & Wet" debuted at its peak of number 17 on the US Billboard Hot 100, spending seven weeks on the chart. The single also debuted at its peak of number four on the Billboard Hot R&B/Hip-Hop Songs chart, spending eleven weeks on the chart. The track peaked at number 30 on the Pop Airplay chart on March 8, 2025. The song spent a total of 13 weeks on Rhythmic chart, eventually peaking at number five on March 8, 2025. "Fat Juicy & Wet" debuts at its peak of number 27 on the Canadian Hot 100 chart, spending four weeks on the chart.

"Fat Juicy & Wet" peaked at number one on Nicaragua Anglo Airplay. On the New Zealand Singles Chart, the song debuted at number 36 on January 31, 2025, and peaked at number 31 the following week. On the Billboard Japan Hot Overseas, the song debuted at its peak of number three. In Australia, the song charted at number 55. In the United Kingdom, the single peaked at number 32 on the UK Singles Chart, spending five weeks on the chart. "Fat Juicy & Wet" peaked at number 22 on the Billboard Global 200. The single found some moderate success on Hip Hop and R&B charts.

== Music video ==
An accompanying music video was released on January 24, 2025, and was directed by Mars and Daniel Ramos. The video, in which the theme is the color red, both Red and Mars are seen flirting and celebrating with champagne bottles and soap bubbles. It starts with Mars wearing an oversize suit while petting a white cat. Red also wears a big suit, "late 80s Madonna", as she poses "in front of giant red letters" spelling "SEXYY". In a different scene Mars mops a wet floor, while Red sits on an enormous couch. This is followed by them appreciating a simulated boat ride and Red using "a water gun".

It features cameos from Lady Gaga and Rosé. In the end of the video, the four artists dance in matching black pant suits, open champagne bottles and lip-sync the chorus against a dark red backdrop. Anna Kaufman writing for USA Today said that the music video "brings the sexual metaphors to life." Malcom Trapp from Rap-Up found the video filled with "sexual euphemisms" and The Express Tribune called the video "vibrant". Fans found the cameos an "unexpected crossover."

== Personnel ==
Credits adapted from CD liner notes.

Recording

- Recorded at Glenwood Place Recording (Burbank, California)
- Recorded and mixed at Beach Wave Sound (North Hollywood, California)
- Mastered at Singing Master (Atlanta, Georgia)

Personnel

- Janae Wherry – vocals, songwriting
- Bruno Mars – vocals, songwriting, production
- Johnathan Yip – songwriting, background vocals, synthesizer
- Jeremy Reeves – songwriting, background vocals, bass
- Ray Romulus – songwriting, background vocals, drums
- Kameron Glasper – songwriting, background vocals
- The Stereotypes – production, programming
- Charles Moniz – recording
- Kyle Kashiwagi – recording
- Rajon Brown – recording
- Ronald "[RD]" Estrada – recording
- Alex Resoagli – engineering assistant
- Noah Damasen – engineering assistant
- Kevin "K.D." Davis – mixing
- Colin Leonard – mastering

== Charts ==
=== Weekly charts ===
List of chart positions
Chart (2025)	Peak position
Australia (ARIA)	55
Australia Hip Hop/R&B (ARIA)	8
Canada Hot 100 (Billboard)	27
Chile Anglo Airplay (Monitor Latino)	11
Croatia International Airplay (Top lista)	84
France (SNEP)	174
Global 200 (Billboard)	22
Greece International (IFPI)	33
Japan Hot Overseas (Billboard Japan)	3
Lebanon (Lebanese Top 20)	13
Netherlands (Dutch Tipparade)	25
New Zealand (Recorded Music NZ)	31
Nicaragua Anglo Airplay (Monitor Latino)	1
Nigeria (TurnTable Top 100)	24
Portugal (AFP)	151
San Marino Airplay (SMRTV Top 50)	39
Sweden Heatseeker (Sverigetopplistan)	5
Switzerland (Schweizer Hitparade)	85
UK Singles (Official Charts)	32
UK Hip Hop/R&B (Official Charts)	9
US Billboard Hot 100	17
US Hot R&B/Hip-Hop Songs (Billboard)	4
US Pop Airplay (Billboard)	30
US Rhythmic Airplay (Billboard)	5

=== Year-end charts ===
List of chart positions
Chart (2025)	Position
US Hot R&B/Hip-Hop Songs (Billboard)	50
US Rhythmic Airplay (Billboard)	48

== Certifications ==
List of certifications
Region	Certification	Certified units/sales
Canada (Music Canada)	Platinum	80,000^{‡}
^{‡} Sales+streaming figures based on certification alone.

== Release history ==
List of release history, showing region(s), date(s), format(s) and label(s)
Region	Date	Format	Label	Ref.
Various	January 24, 2025	Digital download; streaming	Rebel; Gamma; The Smeezingtons; Atlantic	
Italy	January 24, 2025	Radio airplay	Warner Italy	
United States	January 28, 2025	Rhythmic contemporary	—N/a	
