= New World Depression =

2024 album by Suicideboys

Studio album by Suicideboys
- Released: June 14, 2024
- Recorded: 2023–2024
- Genre: Southern hip-hop; horrorcore
- Length: 34:16
- Label: G*59
- Producer: Budd Dwyer

Suicideboys chronology
Sing Me a Lullaby, My Sweet Temptation (2022)	New World Depression (2024)	Thy Kingdom Come (2025)

Singles from New World Depression
- 1. "Us vs. Them" Released: March 29, 2024; 2. "Are You Going to See the Rose in the Vase, or the Dust on the Table" Released: April 19, 2024; 3. "The Thin Grey Line" Released: May 24, 2024

New World Depression is the fourth studio album by American hip-hop duo Suicideboys. It was released on June 14, 2024 via G*59 Records and preceded by three singles: "Us vs. Them", "Are You Going to See the Rose in the Vase, or the Dust on the Table" and "The Thin Grey Line". Budd Dwyer produced the album, with additional producers Aasis Beats, 685floyd, and KXVI.

== Critical reception ==
Professional ratings
Review scores
Source	Rating
Crack	7/10
Slant Magazine	3/5 stars

Emma Garland of Crack commented the album "doesn't reach for new subject matter as much as it reframes the old". Additionally, she added that "There's a fresh sharpness to their delivery on New World Depression, too; a weightless calm washes over the whole record that would previously only appear in flashes."

Steve Erickson of Slant Magazine wrote "While $crim and Ruby are now in their 30s, tracks like 'The Thin Grey Line' have a teenage edgelord quality to them: 'Talking about killing got my dick getting hard.' The group's attitude remains similar, with brash boasts mixed with equally extreme evocations of outrageous violence and drug use. Over the course of an entire album, this grows monotonous, just as their relentless, exaggerated misogyny quickly becomes grating."

He additionally stated, "Horrorcore isn't known for tasteful lyrics, but even its uglier moments have been a way for artists to express their struggles with addiction and mental health. The fact that, for $uicideboy$, these experiences are so closely tied up with how they treat women makes New World Depression a harder pill to swallow. 'If I got to pick the drugs or a bitch, you know what I'm choosing,' goes one lyric on 'Misery in Waking Hours.'"

== Track listing ==
All tracks are written by Aristos Petrou and Scott Arceneaux Jr., except for "Transgressions" and "Us vs. Them", written with Eliot Dubock, and "The Light at the End of the Tunnel for $9.99 a Month", written with Karma-Ann Swanepoel due to a sample of her song "Once". All tracks are produced by Budd Dwyer.

New World Depression track listing
No.	Title	Length
1.	"Lone Wolf Hysteria"	1:47
2.	"Mental Clarity Is a Luxury I Can't Afford"	2:25
3.	"The Thin Grey Line"	1:45
4.	"Thorns"	2:10
5.	"Misery in Waking Hours"	3:39
6.	"Burgundy"	4:28
7.	"Transgressions"	2:17
8.	"Are You Going to See the Rose in the Vase, or the Dust on the Table"	2:30
9.	"All of My Problems Always Involve Me"	2:01
10.	"The Light at the End of the Tunnel for $9.99 a Month"	2:19
11.	"Drag 'Em to the River (Totalitarian Remix)"	3:47
12.	"Us vs. Them"	3:04
13.	"Kill Yourself V"	1:56
Total length:		34:16

== Charts ==
=== Weekly charts ===
Weekly chart performance for New World Depression
Chart (2024)	Peak position
Australian Albums (ARIA)	6
Austrian Albums (Ö3 Austria)	14
Belgian Albums (Ultratop Flanders)	58
Belgian Albums (Ultratop Wallonia)	97
Canadian Albums (Billboard)	12
Dutch Albums (Album Top 100)	67
Finnish Albums (Suomen virallinen lista)	11
German Albums (Offizielle Top 100)	14
New Zealand Albums (RMNZ)	3
Swiss Albums (Schweizer Hitparade)	27
UK Albums (OCC)	87
UK Independent Albums (OCC)	25
UK R&B Albums (OCC)	3
US Billboard 200	5
US Independent Albums (Billboard)	1
US Top R&B/Hip-Hop Albums (Billboard)	1

=== Year-end charts ===
Year-end chart performance for New World Depression
Chart (2024)	Position
US Billboard 200	173
US Top R&B/Hip-Hop Albums (Billboard)	48

== Certifications ==
Certifications for New World Depression
Region	Certification	Certified units/sales
New Zealand (RMNZ)	Gold	7,500^{‡}
^{‡} Sales+streaming figures based on certification alone.
