= Are You Going to See the Rose in the Vase, or the Dust on the Table =

2024 single by Suicideboys

Single by Suicideboys

from the album New World Depression
- Released: April 19, 2024
- Genre: Trap, emo rap
- Length: 2:30
- Label: G*59
- Songwriters: Scott Arceneaux Jr.; Aristos Petrou
- Producer: Budd Dwyer

Suicideboys singles chronology
"Us Vs. Them" (2024)	"Are You Going to See the Rose in the Vase, or the Dust on the Table" (2024)	"The Thin Grey Line" (2024)

"Are You Going to See the Rose in the Vase, or the Dust on the Table" is a song by American hip-hop duo Suicideboys, released on April 19, 2024, as the second single from their fourth studio album, New World Depression (2024).

== Composition ==
The song contains trap production including cowbells and heavy bass, while the lyrics are about using drugs, feeling lonely, and wondering if anyone will offer support.

== Charts ==
Chart performance for "Are You Going to See the Rose in the Vase, or the Dust on the Table"
Chart (2024)	Peak position
New Zealand Hot Singles (RMNZ)	8
US Bubbling Under Hot 100 (Billboard)	6
US Hot R&B/Hip-Hop Songs (Billboard)	33
