= Long Term Effects of Suffering =

Studio album by Suicideboys
- Released: August 13, 2021
- Recorded: 2018–2021
- Genre: Underground hip-hop; trap
- Length: 32:56
- Label: G*59 Records
- Producer: Budd Dwyer; Caldeira; UV Killin Em; JBento; PVLACE

Suicideboys chronology
I Want to Die in New Orleans (2018)	Long Term Effects of Suffering (2021)	Sing Me A Lullaby, My Sweet Temptation (2022)

Singles from Long Term Effects of Suffering
- 1. "New Profile Pic" Released: April 16, 2021; 2. "Avalon" Released: May 21, 2021; 3. "Materialism as a Means to an End" Released: July 16, 2021

Professional ratings
Review scores
Source	Rating
AllMusic	3/5 stars
HipHopDX	2.8/5
Pitchfork	6.7/10

Long Term Effects of Suffering (stylized as Long Term Effects of SUFFERING) is the second studio album by American hip hop duo Suicideboys. It was released on August 13, 2021, via G*59 Records. Production was handled by member Scott Arceneaux Jr ($crim). The album was preceded by three singles: "New Profile Pic", "Avalon", and "Materialism as a Means to an End".

In the United States, the album peaked at number seven on the Billboard 200, number three on the Top R&B/Hip-Hop Albums chart, number two on the Top Rap Albums chart, and number one on the Independent Albums chart. It also reached number eight in New Zealand, number twelve in Finland, and number eighteen in Australia.

== Track listing ==
All tracks are written by Aristos Petrou and Scott Arceneaux Jr. and produced by Budd Dwyer, except for "Life Is But a Stream~" and "The Number You Have Dialed Is Not In Service", written with Devin Phillion and produced with Caldeira, UV Killin Em, and JBento respectively.

Long Term Effects of Suffering track listing
No.	Title	Length
1.	"Degeneration in the Key of A Minor"	2:08
2.	"If Self-Destruction Was an Olympic Event, I'd Be Tonya Harding"	2:22
3.	"Life Is But a Stream~"	2:02
4.	"5 Grand at 8 to 1"	2:49
5.	"We Envy Nothing In The World"	2:51
6.	"Lighting the Flames of My Own Personal Hell"	1:50
7.	"New Profile Pic"	2:07
8.	"Bleach"	2:40
9.	"Forget It"	3:18
10.	"Avalon"	2:20
11.	"Materialism as a Means to an End"	2:46
12.	"Ugliest"	2:58
13.	"The Number You Have Dialed Is Not in Service"	2:45
Total length:		32:56

=== Notes ===
- "We Envy Nothing in the World" is stylized in all caps and a punctuation.

== Charts ==
=== Weekly charts ===
Chart (2021–2022)	Peak position
Australian Albums (ARIA)	18
Austrian Albums (Ö3 Austria)	45
Belgian Albums (Ultratop Flanders)	76
Canadian Albums (Billboard)	26
Finnish Albums (Suomen virallinen lista)	12
German Albums (Offizielle Top 100)	61
New Zealand Albums (RMNZ)	8
Swiss Albums (Schweizer Hitparade)	29
UK R&B Albums (OCC)	23
US Billboard 200	7
US Top R&B/Hip-Hop Albums (Billboard)	3
US Top Rap Albums (Billboard)	2
US Independent Albums (Billboard)	1

=== Year-end charts ===
Chart (2021)	Position
US Top R&B/Hip-Hop Albums (Billboard)	99

== Certifications ==
Region	Certification	Certified units/sales
United States (RIAA)	Gold	500,000^{‡}
^{‡} Sales+streaming figures based on certification alone.
