= Napoleon (Suicideboys song) =

2025 song by Suicideboys

Single by Suicideboys

from the album Thy Kingdom Come
- Released: August 16, 2025
- Genre: Bounce
- Length: 2:36
- Label: G*59
- Songwriters: Scott Arceneaux Jr.; Aristos Petrou
- Producer: Budd Dwyer

"Napoleon" is a song by American hip hop duo Suicideboys, released on August 1, 2025 from their fifth studio album Thy Kingdom Come. It is a bounce song that contains a sample of "Gin in My System" by Big Freedia. It was serviced to Rhythmic Contemporary radio on August 16, 2025.

== Critical reception ==
Mackenzie Cummings-Grady of Billboard ranked "Napoleon" as the fifth best song from Thy Kingdom Come, describing that it "cleverly" samples "Gin in My System" and "is perhaps $uicideboy$' most playful song… maybe ever?" She also wrote, "Fans will notice that the duo's infamous alter ego, 7th Ward Lord, is back in action, making 'Napoleon' a devilishly good time from start to finish." A.D. Amorosi of Flood Magazine called the song "wise-assed".

== Charts ==
Chart performance for "Napoleon"
Chart (2025)	Peak position
Canada Hot 100 (Billboard)	83
New Zealand Hot Singles (RMNZ)	2
US Billboard Hot 100	54
US Hot R&B/Hip-Hop Songs (Billboard)	12
US Rhythmic Airplay (Billboard)	12
