= Ramirez (rapper) =

American rapper (born 1996)

- Born: Ivan Ramirez; June 28, 1994 (age 32); San Francisco, California, U.S.
- Genres: Hip hop; cloud rap; West Coast hip hop; dark trap
- Occupations: Rapper; songwriter
- Years active: 2014–present
- Website: ramirez187.com

Ivan Ramirez (born June 28, 1994), better known as Ramirez, is an American rapper and songwriter from San Francisco, California. He is a co-founder and former member of Suicideboys' label G*59 Records, and has released multiple collaborations with them. He is of Mexican and Nicaraguan descent.

== Discography ==
=== Albums ===
- Trillity (2013)
- Pharaohs (2014)
- Captain Levi (2014)
- Latino Heat (2015)
- Blood Diamonds (2015)
- Meet Me Where the River Turns Grey (2016)
- The Grey Gorilla (2017)
- Blood Diamonds 2 (2018)
- Son of Serpentine (2019)
- Tha Playa$ Manual (2020) (with Rocci)
- The Tragedy of a Clown (2022)
- From tha Guttah to tha Grave (2024)
- The Warlock and the Gorilla (2024)
- Tha Playa$ Manual II (2025)
- Brabus & Lorinsers (2026)
- Velvet Playa$ (2026)

=== EPs ===
- Winter (2014)
- G.R.E.Y.G.O.D.S (2015) (with $uicideboy$)
- Levi x Genshin (2015)
- G.R.E.Y.G.O.D.S.I.I. (2016) (with $uicideboy$)
- 666 (2016)
- Let Me Die Where I Stand (2016)
- Judgment Day (2016)
- Judgement Day: Apocalypse (2016)
- Paradise Lost (2016)
- Levi x Genshin 2 (2016)
- Judgement Day: Revelation (2017)

=== Mixtapes ===
- Lust & Sensations (2015)
- Lust & Sensations II (2016)
