= Sing Me a Lullaby, My Sweet Temptation =

Studio album by Suicideboys
- Released: July 29, 2022
- Genre: Cloud rap
- Length: 36:00
- Label: G*59
- Producer: Budd Dwyer; Baredex

Suicideboys chronology
| Long Term Effects of Suffering (2021) | Sing Me a Lullaby, My Sweet Temptation (2022) | New World Depression (2024) |

Singles from Sing Me a Lullaby, My Sweet Temptation
- 1. "The Evil That Men Do" Released: April 22, 2022; 2. "Escape from Babylon" Released: June 10, 2022

Professional ratings
Review scores
| Source | Rating |
|---|---|
| AllMusic | 3/5 stars |
| Spectrum Culture | 65%/100% |

Sing Me a Lullaby, My Sweet Temptation is the third studio album by American hip hop duo Suicideboys. It was released on July 29, 2022, via G*59 Records. As with their previous releases, production was handled by Scrim under his producer alias Budd Dwyer. The album was preceded by two singles: "The Evil That Men Do" and "Escape from Babylon". The latter reached No. 22 on the US Bubbling Under Hot 100.

In the United States, the album peaked at number seven on the Billboard 200, number two on both the Top R&B/Hip-Hop Albums and Independent Albums, and topped the Top Rap Albums chart. It also reached number six in New Zealand, number fourteen in Finland, and number twenty-six in Australia and Canada.

== Track listing ==
All tracks are written by Aristos Petrou and Scott Arceneaux Jr. and produced by Budd Dwyer, except for "Ashes of Luxury", written with Devin Phillion and produced with Baredex.

Sing Me a Lullaby, My Sweet Temptation track listing
| No. | Title | Length |
|---|---|---|
| 1. | "Genesis" | 2:42 |
| 2. | "Matte Black" | 3:58 |
| 3. | "Fucking Your Culture" | 3:15 |
| 4. | "1000 Blunts" | 2:55 |
| 5. | "In Constant Sorrow" | 2:38 |
| 6. | "Escape from Babylon" | 2:21 |
| 7. | "Ashes of Luxury" | 1:37 |
| 8. | "Resistance Is Useless" | 2:22 |
| 9. | "Eulogy" | 3:47 |
| 10. | "No Matter Which Direction I'm Going In, I Never Chase These Hoes" | 2:34 |
| 11. | "Suicideboys Were Better in 2015" | 2:23 |
| 12. | "Unlucky Me" | 2:35 |
| 13. | "The Evil That Men Do" | 2:53 |
| Total length: | | 36:00 |

=== Notes ===
- "Escape from Babylon" is stylized as "Escape from BABYLON"
- "The Evil That Men Do" is stylized as "THE_EVIL_THAT_MEN_DO"

== Charts ==
=== Weekly charts ===
Weekly chart performance for Sing Me a Lullaby, My Sweet Temptation
| Chart (2022–2023) | Peak position |
|---|---|
| Australian Albums (ARIA) | 42 |
| Austrian Albums (Ö3 Austria) | 26 |
| Belgian Albums (Ultratop Flanders) | 155 |
| Canadian Albums (Billboard) | 26 |
| Finnish Albums (Suomen virallinen lista) | 14 |
| German Albums (Offizielle Top 100) | 47 |
| New Zealand Albums (RMNZ) | 6 |
| Swiss Albums (Schweizer Hitparade) | 51 |
| UK R&B Albums (OCC) | 5 |
| US Billboard 200 | 7 |
| US Top R&B/Hip-Hop Albums (Billboard) | 2 |
| US Top Rap Albums (Billboard) | 1 |
| US Independent Albums (Billboard) | 2 |

=== Year-end charts ===
Year-end chart performance for Sing Me a Lullaby, My Sweet Temptation
| Chart (2022) | Position |
|---|---|
| US Top R&B/Hip-Hop Albums (Billboard) | 75 |

== Certifications ==
| Region | Certification | Certified units/sales |
|---|---|---|
| United States (RIAA) | Platinum | 1,000,000^{‡} |
^{‡} Sales+streaming figures based on certification alone.
