= Now and at the Hour of Our Death =

2025 single by Suicideboys featuring Bones

Single by Suicideboys featuring Bones

from the album Thy Kingdom Come
- Released: June 20, 2025
- Genre: Horrorcore; trap; memphis rap
- Length: 4:14
- Label: G*59
- Songwriters: Scott Arceneaux Jr.; Aristos Petrou
- Producer: Budd Dwyer

Suicideboys singles chronology
"Self-Inflicted" (2025)	"Now and at the Hour of Our Death" (2025)

Bones singles chronology
"CelebrityDeathmatch" (2025)	"Now and at the Hour of Our Death" (2025)	"HellInACell" (2025)

Music video
- "Now and at the Hour of Our Death" on YouTube

"Now and at the Hour of Our Death" is a song by American hip hop duo Suicideboys, released on June 20, 2025 as the second single from their fifth studio album Thy Kingdom Come (2025). It features American rapper Bones.

== Composition ==
The song contains trap production, over which the rappers center around murder, suicide, and drug use. The style has been compared to that of Cypress Hill.

== Critical reception ==
The song received generally positive reviews. Gabriel Bras Nevares of HotNewHipHop lauded Bones' feature, "His passionate and flow-switching performance on the backend here is quite impressive, and matches well with $crim and Ruby Da Cherry's relentless spitting." He further remarked, "Elsewhere, the instrumental carries its momentum forward with a tough trap beat, ghostly backing keys, haunting tones, and occasional group chants. It's a banger through and through, and the flows on here are what provide more dynamism and progression through an otherwise straightforward structure. There aren't any hooks on here: just bars on bars and a whole lot of eerie atmosphere." A.D. Amorosi of Flood Magazine stated that the song finds Suicideboys "huffing and puffing with a mighty mean wind, and yet the topic is more humorous than it is harming". Mackenzie Cummings-Grady of Billboard ranked it as the best song from Thy Kingdom Come, writing that "the chemistry between these three protectors of the shadow realm feels almost familial, begging the question of why this collaboration didn't happen sooner. The trio slides through their verses so nonchalantly that it's hard to tell where one rapper ends and the other begins. But real ones know how it sounds when the Graveyard Prince enters the room."

== Charts ==
Chart performance for "Now and at the Hour of Our Death"
Chart (2025)	Peak position
New Zealand Hot Singles (RMNZ)	13
US Billboard Hot 100	100
US Hot R&B/Hip-Hop Songs (Billboard)	26
