= ...And to Those I Love, Thanks for Sticking Around =

2020 single by Suicideboys

Single by Suicideboys

from the album Stop Staring at the Shadows
- Released: February 14, 2020
- Genre: Emo rap
- Length: 2:48
- Label: G*59
- Songwriters: Scott Arceneaux Jr.; Aristos Petrou
- Producer: Budd Dwyer

Suicideboys singles chronology
| "Napoleon" (2019) | "...And to Those I Love, Thanks for Sticking Around" (2020) | "Zuccenberg" (2021) |

"...And to Those I Love, Thanks for Sticking Around" is a song by American hip-hop duo Suicideboys and the third single from their mixtape Stop Staring at the Shadows (2020).

== Charts ==
Chart performance for "...And to Those I Love, Thanks for Sticking Around"
| Chart (2020–2021) | Peak position |
|---|---|
| Global 200 (Billboard) | 128 |
| New Zealand Hot Singles (RMNZ) | 35 |
| US Bubbling Under Hot 100 (Billboard) | 5 |
| US Hot R&B/Hip-Hop Songs (Billboard) | 46 |

== Samples ==
The song consists of a construction kit "Vintage" by Royalty Free Audio.

== Certifications ==
Certifications for "...And to Those I Love, Thanks for Sticking Around"
| Region | Certification | Certified units/sales |
|---|---|---|
| United Kingdom (BPI) | Silver | 200,000^{‡} |
| United States (RIAA) | 3× Platinum | 3,000,000^{‡} |
^{‡} Sales+streaming figures based on certification alone.
