= Thy Kingdom Come (Suicideboys album) =

Studio album by Suicideboys
- Released: August 1, 2025
- Recorded: 2020–2025
- Genres: Southern hip-hop; horrorcore; trap; R&B; cloud rap
- Length: 29:02
- Label: G*59
- Producers: Ben10k; Budd Dwyer; Lily Kaplan

Suicideboys chronology
New World Depression (2024)	Thy Kingdom Come (2025)	Thy Will Be Done (2025)

Singles from Thy Kingdom Come
- 1. "Self-Inflicted" Released: May 9, 2025; 2. "Now and at the Hour of Our Death" Released: June 20, 2025; 3. "Napoleon" Released: August 16, 2025

Thy Kingdom Come (stylized in all caps) is the fifth studio album by American hip hop duo Suicideboys. Following their 2024 album New World Depression, it was released on August 1, 2025 via G*59 Records.

== Background and promotion ==
Sometime in 2025, Scrim announced on the Suicideboys' Discord server Greycord that a new album would be released before the GreyDay Tour 2025. Lead single "Self-Inflicted" would be released on May 9, along with the album title being confirmed. The track listing was announced on May 22, although the guest appearances were hidden; one of them would be revealed on June 20 when "Now and at the Hour of Our Death", featuring Bones, was released. The album's release date was officially announced on June 28. The duo would appear in a Billboard cover story on July 17.

== Commercial performance ==
Thy Kingdom Come debuted at number 4 on the Billboard 200 chart for the week of August 16, 2025, with 57,000 album-equivalent units, of which 34,000 were from streaming (equivalent to 45.5 million on-demand streams) and 23,000 of which were from pure album sales, marking Suicideboys' highest-charting album to date. It also debuted at number 1 on the Top Rap Albums and Top R&B/Hip-Hop Albums charts, further marking their first album debuting at number 1 on the latter chart.

== Track listing ==
All tracks are written by Aristos Petrou and Scott Arceneaux Jr. and produced by Budd Dwyer, except where listed.

Thy Kingdom Come track listing
No.	Title	Writer(s)	Producer(s)	Length
1.	"Count Your Blessings"			4:08
2.	"Napoleon"			2:36
3.	"Oh, What a Wretched Man I Am!"			2:39
4.	"Full of Grace (I Refuse to Tend My Own Grave)"	Petrou; Arceneaux; Benjamin Wilson; Lily Kaplan	Budd Dwyer; Ben10k; Kaplan	3:00
5.	"Chain Breaker"			2:13
6.	"Now and at the Hour of Our Death" (featuring Bones)	Petrou; Arceneaux; Elmo Kennedy O'Connor		4:14
7.	"Self-Inflicted"			1:27
8.	"Grey+Grey+Grey"			2:40
9.	"Carried Away" (featuring Night Lovell)	Petrou; Arceneaux; Shermar Paul		3:43
10.	"Monochromatic"			2:17
Total length:				29:02

Notes

- "Count Your Blessings" and "Grey+Grey+Grey" are stylized in all caps.
- "Napoleon" contains a sample of "Gin in My System", written by Freddie Ross Jr. and Adam Pigott, and performed by Big Freedia.

== Charts ==
=== Weekly charts ===
Weekly performance for Thy Kingdom Come
Chart (2025)	Peak position
Australian Albums (ARIA)	21
Australian Hip Hop/R&B Albums (ARIA)	6
Austrian Albums (Ö3 Austria)	46
Belgian Albums (Ultratop Flanders)	169
Canadian Albums (Billboard)	23
Czech Albums (ČNS IFPI)	17
Finnish Albums (Suomen virallinen lista)	25
German Albums (Offizielle Top 100)	60
Hungarian Albums (MAHASZ)	36
Lithuanian Albums (AGATA)	21
New Zealand Albums (RMNZ)	6
Polish Albums (ZPAV)	56
Portuguese Streaming Albums (AFP)	182
Slovak Albums (ČNS IFPI)	11
Swiss Albums (Schweizer Hitparade)	24
US Billboard 200	4
US Independent Albums (Billboard)	1
US Top Rap Albums (Billboard)	1
US Top R&B/Hip-Hop Albums (Billboard)	1

=== Year-end charts ===
Year-end chart performance for Thy Kingdom Come
Chart (2025)	Position
US Top R&B/Hip-Hop Albums (Billboard)	66
