= Carrollton (song) =

2018 single by Suicideboys

Single by Suicideboys

from the album I Want to Die in New Orleans
- Released: August 1, 2018
- Genre: Southern hip hop; hardcore hip hop; trap
- Length: 3:23
- Label: G*59
- Songwriter(s): Scott Arceneaux Jr.; Aristos Petrou
- Producer(s): Budd Dwyer

Suicideboys singles chronology
"Cutthroat Smile" (2018)	"Carrollton" (2018)	"Meet Mr. Niceguy" (2018)

"Carrollton" is a song by American hip hop duo Suicideboys, released on August 1, 2018, as the lead single from their debut studio album I Want to Die in New Orleans (2018).

== Composition ==
The song has been described as a "dirty-south banger with hyper-distorted, deadpanned vocals reminiscent of Marilyn Manson." It opens with an intro from rapper Juicy J and contains distorted bass and "ominous" bells within the beat, with depression and horror-themed lyrics that additionally detail the duo's indulgences in wealth.

== Critical reception ==
Devin Ch of HotNewHipHop wrote "The message on 'Carrollton' is a part of a well-aimed contingency to connect with Society's outliers. I should preface that 'connect' is a term imbued with irony. The only thing idiomatic about lyrics like 'slap my face against a pill to crush it up' is the non-compliance act you the listener wrote into the script."

== Samples ==
The song consists of a construction kit Drip 808 Drop by Big Citi Loops.

== Certifications ==
Certifications for "Carollton"
Region	Certification	Certified units/sales
United States (RIAA)	Gold	500,000^{‡}
^{‡} Sales+streaming figures based on certification alone.
