= Paris (Suicideboys song) =

2015 single by Suicideboys

Single by Suicideboys

from the album Now the Moon's Rising
- Released: November 18, 2015
- Genre: Trap metal; horrorcore
- Length: 1:51
- Label: G*59
- Songwriters: Scott Arceneaux Jr.; Aristos Petrou
- Producer: Budd Dwyer

Suicideboys singles chronology
"Fuckthepopulation" (2015)	"Paris" (2015)	"Antartica" (2016)

Music video
- "Paris" on YouTube

"Paris" is a song by American hip hop duo Suicideboys and the lead single from their mixtape Now the Moon's Rising (2015).

== Critical reception ==
Eli Enis of Revolver wrote of the song, "$crim's machine-gun stutter flow is hype as fuck, and then Ruby opens his verse with one of the gut-bustingly funny bars in his repertoire: 'Ruby was a motherfucking reject/Then I cut my wrists, and now I motherfucking bleed checks.'" In a fan poll conducted by the magazine, "Paris" was ranked the second best song by Suicideboys.

== Certifications ==
Certifications for "Paris"
Region	Certification	Certified units/sales
New Zealand (RMNZ)	2× Platinum	60,000^{‡}
United States (RIAA)	Gold	500,000^{‡}
^{‡} Sales+streaming figures based on certification alone.
