= Devil Is a Lie =

Single by Tommy Richman
- Released: June 14, 2024
- Genre: Hip-hop
- Length: 2:11
- Label: ISO Supremacy; Pulse; Concord
- Songwriter: Thomas Richman
- Producers: Jonah Roy; Max Vossberg; Kavi

Tommy Richman singles chronology
"Million Dollar Baby" (2024)	"Devil Is a Lie" (2024)	"Thought You Were the One" (2024)

Music video
- "Devil Is a Lie" on YouTube

"Devil Is a Lie" is a song by American singer Tommy Richman, released on June 14, 2024. It was produced by Jonah Roy, Max Vossberg and Kavi.

== Background ==
Tommy Richman first previewed the song on the video-sharing platform TikTok on May 27, 2024, and again on June 6, leading the song to gain significant attention prior to its release.

== Composition ==
The song has been widely compared to music by the Neptunes during the 2000s, in regard to the beat and style. It uses a violin melody and synthesizer chords with Tommy Richman blending elements of disco and funk in his vocals. Lyrically, he sings about his success and that he will not let anyone or anything preventing him from accomplishing it.

== Critical reception ==
Danilo Castro of HotNewHipHop gave a positive review, writing "'Devil Is a Lie' is the best kind of retro song, in that it captures the feeling of the 00s without trying too hard to recapture its sound. It reminds us of other artists, but it's still, definitively, Tommy Richman. The dynamics between the chorus and the bridge is absurdly catchy, and the lyrics are playfully aligned with the instrumental. The singer doesn't have much to say, but his vocals, and his stylish delivery, will make it easy to memorize each line. He's also more audible than he was on 'Million Dollar Baby.' A lot of songs aim to be summer playlist material, but 'Devil Is a Lie' feels like the rare instance of a song succeeding in doing so."

== Music video ==
An official music video was released alongside the song. It features a camcorder aesthetic similar to his video for "Million Dollar Baby". Tommy Richman is seen having a photoshoot with a blue pinstriped 1984 Cadillac Coupe de Ville lowrider courtesy of Diplomatics Car Club and visiting a strip club. Additionally, rapper Nettspend had a cameo appearance in the video.

== Charts ==
=== Weekly charts ===
Weekly chart performance for "Devil Is a Lie"
Chart (2024)	Peak position
Australia (ARIA)	18
Australia Hip Hop/R&B (ARIA)	4
Canada Hot 100 (Billboard)	26
Global 200 (Billboard)	37
Ireland (IRMA)	47
Lithuania (AGATA)	48
New Zealand (Recorded Music NZ)	9
Portugal (AFP)	185
UK Singles (OCC)	21
UK Hip Hop/R&B (OCC)	4
US Billboard Hot 100	32
US Hot R&B/Hip-Hop Songs (Billboard)	9
US Rhythmic Airplay (Billboard)	2

=== Year-end charts ===
2024 year-end chart performance for "Devil Is a Lie"
Chart (2024)	Position
US Hot R&B/Hip-Hop Songs (Billboard)	51

2025 year-end chart performance for "Devil Is a Lie"
Chart (2025)	Position
US Rhythmic Airplay (Billboard)	45

== Certifications ==
Certifications for "Devil Is a Lie"
Region	Certification	Certified units/sales
Australia (ARIA)	Platinum	70,000^{‡}
Brazil (Pro-Música Brasil)	Platinum	40,000^{‡}
Canada (Music Canada)	Platinum	80,000^{‡}
New Zealand (RMNZ)	Platinum	30,000^{‡}
United Kingdom (BPI)	Silver	200,000^{‡}
United States (RIAA)	Platinum	1,000,000^{‡}
^{‡} Sales+streaming figures based on certification alone.
