= Ham Sandwich (song) =

Single by Getter
- Released: 20 February 2019
- Genre: Trap; experimental
- Length: 3:45
- Label: Self-released
- Songwriter(s): Tanner Petulla
- Producer(s): Tanner Petulla

Getter singles chronology
"Made For You (Alone Again)" (2018)	"Ham Sandwich" (2019)	"Never Change" (2019)

"Ham Sandwich" is a song by American electronic dance music producer Getter. It was self-released by Getter on February 20, 2019.

== Background and release ==
On February 20, 2019, the song was self-released as a digital download on international digital stores, as well as being released through various music streaming services. The song was released partially as a response to fans who were displeased with Getter's album Visceral, released in late 2018. It was also released shortly before the launch of his Visceral Tour, based on his album of the same name.

== Critical reception ==
"Ham Sandwich" was well received by most critics. Farrell Sweeney of Dancing Astronaut categorised it as an experimental trap song, writing that it combined "wobbly, wonky synth layers with a steady drumbeat for a syrupy, downtempo drip that has all the makings of a menacing bass cut, but rather opts for a more laid back disposition." Your EDM's Matthew Meadow praised the song heavily, comparing it to Getter's album Visceral and stating that while the songs found on the album were a mix of various genres of electronic music, "Ham Sandwich" is "unmistakably trap, through and through", as well as noting the song's artwork as "traumatising." Writing for EDMTunes, Ariel Thompson wrote that Getter had incorporated "destructive sounds for a filthy rattling trap sensation", further describing the song as a "glitchy trap banger that includes eerie synths and suspenseful build ups." Selbe Dittman of EDM Sauce noted it as a "deep and heavy trap track", generally describing it as "nothing we've heard from the artist before, and it's left us wanting more."

== Track listing ==
Digital download – Single
No.	Title	Length
1.	"Ham Sandwich"	3:45

== Release history ==
Region	Date	Format	Version	Label	Ref.
Worldwide	February 20, 2019	Digital download	"Ham Sandwich"	Self-released	
