= Actin Up =

2025 single by Tommy Richman

Single by Tommy Richman

from the EP Worlds Apart
- Released: February 7, 2025
- Genre: Pop rap
- Length: 2:13
- Label: ISO Supremacy; Pulse
- Songwriters: Thomas Richman; Jonah Roy; Kavian Salehi; Max Vossberg; Roman Ortiz
- Producers: Jonah Roy; Kavi

Tommy Richman singles chronology
"Whitney" (2024)	"Actin Up" (2025)	"Chase" (2025)

Sexyy Red singles chronology
"Fat Juicy & Wet" (2025)	"Actin Up" (remix) (2025)	"Me n OG Snoop" (2025)

Music video
- "Actin Up" on YouTube
- "Actin Up with Sexyy Red" on YouTube

"Actin Up" is a song by American singer Tommy Richman, released on February 7, 2025. It was produced by Jonah Roy and Kavi.

== Background ==
Tommy Richman teased the song with a snippet on social media on January 29, 2025. He described the song as "a statement piece made a few months ago as an act of frustration and feeling underestimated. It's an anthem that speaks about giving an underdog a chance."

== Composition ==
"Actin Up" is a pop rap song. It borrows elements from Southern hip hop songs in the 2000s; the production contains "plinky" synth sounds, heavy bass kicks and a steel drum beat similar to that of "Crank That (Soulja Boy)" by Soulja Boy. Tommy Richman raps in his trademark melodic style.

== Critical reception ==
Tom Breihan of Stereogum commented on the song, "Its ultra-rudimentary beat is built from steel-drum patches, like something Soulja Boy would've spent five minutes making in 2007, and Richman sings through what sounds like a mic that's been run over by a steamroller. These are good things. The song floats."

== Commercial performance ==
Following the release of the official remix featuring Sexyy Red, the song debuted at number 96 on the Billboard Hot 100 for the tracking week ending May 3, 2025. It is Richman's third career chart entry.

== Music video ==
The music video was released alongside the song. It sees Tommy Richman partying with his friends at night in various places, including outside a gas station (where he also appears alongside a bouncing car), the side wall of a nightclub and patio of a local greasy spoon.

== Remix ==
An official remix of the song with American rapper Sexyy Red was released on April 18, 2025. Sexyy Red was the first artist that Tommy Richman considered for a remix of "Actin Up", which he called an "anthem for a rebel". Her verse contains sexually explicit lyrics about her sex appeal.

An accompanying music video for the song was released. It was directed by Bobby Banks, produced by Morgana Yasmeen and filmed in Miami. The clip begins with Richman in a darkly lit room, where he is joined by his crew, as they pose next to an expensive red sports car, and dancers. He raps in different locales while in the company of a twerking Sexyy Red. They throw a party in the streets and dance with each other. The car is also a central focus of the video.

== Charts ==
=== Weekly charts ===
Weekly chart performance for "Actin Up"
Chart (2025)	Peak position
US Billboard Hot 100	96
US Hot R&B/Hip-Hop Songs (Billboard)	22
US Rhythmic Airplay (Billboard)	14

=== Year-end charts ===
Year-end chart performance for "Actin Up"
Chart (2025)	Position
US Hot R&B/Hip-Hop Songs (Billboard)	58

== Certifications ==
Region	Certification	Certified units/sales
United States (RIAA)	Gold	500,000^{‡}
^{‡} Sales+streaming figures based on certification alone.
