= Tommy Richman =

American singer and rapper (born 2000)

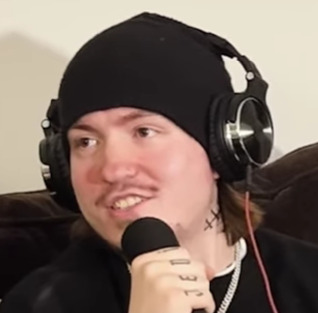
- Richman in 2025

Background information
- Born: Thomas Anatole Richman; March 21, 2000 (age 26); Woodbridge, Virginia, U.S.
- Genres: R&B; pop; bedroom pop; funk
- Occupations: Singer; songwriter; rapper
- Years active: 2016–present
- Labels: ISO Supremacy; PULSE; Universal
- Website: everythingispunk.com

Thomas Anatole Richman (born March 21, 2000) is an American singer, songwriter and rapper. He is best known for his 2024 single "Million Dollar Baby", which debuted at number two on the Billboard Hot 100 after its snippet went viral on TikTok.

== Life and career ==
Richman was born in Woodbridge, Virginia, to a drum teacher father and a legally deaf mother. He began singing as a child, taking voice lessons and performing opera, having studied at Manhattan School of Music with Cynthia Hoffmann.

Richman began releasing music on SoundCloud and Spotify in 2016, where he released his debut song "Ballin' Stalin". He continued to release singles and EPs, with genres including R&B and punk rock. Richman released "Pleasantville" shortly before he was set to return for his sophomore college year, though he would drop out of college to pursue his music career after the song was well received. In 2022, he released Paycheck, his first EP.

In 2023, Richman was signed to Brent Faiyaz's independent record label ISO Supremacy, with a partnered signing with Pulse Records. Richman later opened for Faiyaz's tour F*ck the World, It's a Wasteland Tour, while additionally appearing in Faiyaz's track "Upset" from the 2023 mixtape Larger than Life.

Throughout April 2024, Richman made teasers for his upcoming single "Million Dollar Baby" on TikTok, the first of which being posted on April 13 and which garnered millions of views on the platform. He later released the song on April 26, 2024, quickly receiving 38 million streams, having a U.S. Billboard Hot 100 debut at number 2. It has been considered by some as the song of the summer, and, after debuting at number two on the TikTok Billboard Top 50 on May 11, 2024, it reached number one the following week. His follow-up single, "Devil Is a Lie", peaked within the top 40 of the chart.

Richman's debut studio album, Coyote, was released by ISO Supremacy and Pulse Records on September 27, 2024. Despite the success of "Million Dollar Baby" and "Devil Is a Lie", neither was included on the album, which only entered the Heatseekers charts at number ten.

== Personal life ==
Richman moved from Virginia to Los Angeles, California, in 2022, where he has lived since.

== Discography ==
=== Studio albums ===
Title	Details	Peak chart positions	Sales
Title	Details	US Heat	Sales
Coyote	Released: September 27, 2024; Label: ISO Supremacy, PULSE; Format: Digital download, streaming	10	US: 4,300

=== Mixtapes ===
Title	Details
Worlds Apart	Released: November 21, 2025; Label: ISO Supremacy, PULSE; Format: Digital download, streaming

=== EPs ===
Title	Details
Paycheck	Released: May 13, 2022; Label: Big Effect, Universal Enterprises; Format: Digital download, streaming
Alligator	Released: October 28, 2022; Label: Boom.Records; Format: Digital download, streaming
The Rush	Released: September 8, 2023; Label: ISO Supremacy, PULSE; Format: Digital download, streaming

=== Singles ===
List of singles, showing year released and selected chart positions
Title	Year	Peak chart positions										Certifications	Album
Title	Year	US	AUS	CAN	GER	IRE	NOR	NZ	SWI	UK	WW	Certifications	Album
"Pleasantville"	2019	—	—	—	—	—	—	—	—	—	—		Non-album singles
"Walk"	2019	—	—	—	—	—	—	—	—	—	—		Non-album singles
"Melba"	2019	—	—	—	—	—	—	—	—	—	—		Non-album singles
"Avogadro's Number"	2020	—	—	—	—	—	—	—	—	—	—		Non-album singles
"Pepsi Namco"	2020	—	—	—	—	—	—	—	—	—	—		Non-album singles
"Tu Pax"	2020	—	—	—	—	—	—	—	—	—	—		Non-album singles
"Uncle Pedro"	2020	—	—	—	—	—	—	—	—	—	—		Non-album singles
"Chrono Trigger"	2021	—	—	—	—	—	—	—	—	—	—		Paycheck
"Star Girl"	2021	—	—	—	—	—	—	—	—	—	—		Paycheck
"Games"	2022	—	—	—	—	—	—	—	—	—	—		Paycheck
"Wish I Never Knew You"	2023	—	—	—	—	—	—	—	—	—	—		Non-album singles
"30 Till Midnight"	2023	—	—	—	—	—	—	—	—	—	—		Non-album singles
"Last Nite"	2023	—	—	—	—	—	—	—	—	—	—		The Rush
"Soulcrusher"	2024	—	—	—	—	—	—	—	—	—	—		Non-album singles
"Selfish"	2024	—	—	—	—	—	—	—	—	—	—		Non-album singles
"Million Dollar Baby"	2024	2	1	3	11	5	4	1	6	3	1	RIAA: 6× Platinum; ARIA: 5× Platinum; BPI: Platinum; MC: 5× Platinum; RMNZ: 5× Platinum	Non-album singles
"Devil Is a Lie"	2024	32	18	26	—	47	—	9	—	21	37	RIAA: Platinum; ARIA: Platinum; BPI: Silver; MC: Platinum; RMNZ: Platinum	Non-album singles
"Thought You Were the One"	2024	—	—	—	—	—	—	— (Note: "Thought You Were the One" did not enter the NZ Top 40 Singles Chart, but peaked at number 21 on the NZ Hot Singles Chart.)	—	—	—		Coyote
"Whitney"	2024	—	—	—	—	—	—	— (Note: "Whitney" did not enter the NZ Top 40 Singles Chart, but peaked at number 30 on the NZ Hot Singles Chart.)	—	—	—		Coyote
"Actin Up"	2025	96	—	—	—	—	—	—	—	—	—	RIAA: Gold	Worlds Apart
"Miami"	2025	—	—	—	—	—	—	—	—	—	—		Non-album single
"San Andreas"	2025	—	—	—	—	—	—	—	—	—	—		Worlds Apart
"Bother Me" (with Brent Faiyaz)	2025	—	—	—	—	—	—	— (Note: "Bother Me" did not enter the NZ Top 40 Singles Chart, but peaked at number 36 on the NZ Hot Singles Chart.)	—	—	—		Worlds Apart
"Changes"	2026	—	—	—	—	—	—	—	—	—	—		TBA
"Narcissist" (featuring Viuta)	2026	—	—	—	—	—	—	—	—	—	—		TBA
"—" denotes releases that did not chart or were not released in that region.

=== Other charted and certified songs ===
List of other charted songs, showing year released, selected chart positions and certifications
Title	Year	Peak chart positions			Certifications	Album
Title	Year	US Bub.	US R&B /HH	NZ Hot	Certifications	Album
"Upset" (with Brent Faiyaz and Felix!)	2023	7	33	—	RIAA: Gold	Larger than Life
"Tennessee" (with Trevor Spitta and Zachary Moon)	2024	—	—	37		Coyote
"—" denotes releases that did not chart or were not released in that region.
