= The Thin Grey Line =

2024 single by Suicideboys

Single by Suicideboys

from the album New World Depression
- Released: May 24, 2024
- Genre: phonk
- Length: 1:45
- Label: G*59
- Songwriters: Scott Arceneaux Jr.; Aristos Petrou
- Producer: Budd Dwyer

Suicideboys singles chronology
"Are You Going to See the Rose in the Vase, or the Dust on the Table" (2024)	"The Thin Grey Line" (2024)

Music video
- "The Thin Grey Line" on YouTube

"The Thin Grey Line" is a song by American hip hop duo Suicideboys, released on May 24, 2024, as the third single from their fourth studio album, New World Depression (2024).

== Critical reception ==
Zachary Horvath of HotNewHipHop wrote of the song, "Listeners are already messing with this one too, especially due to $crim's beat and rapping on the backend. The former is dark, as per usual, but the tones looming in the background are eerie and addicting. Even though the track is just 1:45, the duo makes the most of their scant runtime."

== Charts ==
Chart performance for "The Thin Grey Line"
Chart (2024)	Peak position
Canada Hot 100 (Billboard)	88
New Zealand Hot Singles (RMNZ)	3
US Billboard Hot 100	71
US Hot R&B/Hip-Hop Songs (Billboard)	20
