= Million Dollar Baby (Tommy Richman song) =

Single by Tommy Richman
- Released: April 26, 2024
- Genre: R&B; electro-funk; hip-hop
- Length: 2:35 (single version); 2:03 (radio edit)
- Label: ISO Supremacy; PULSE; Concord; Universal
- Songwriters: Tommy Richman; Ava Larae
- Producers: Max Vossberg; Jonah Roy; Mannyvelli; Sparkheem; Kavi; Gidi

Tommy Richman singles chronology
"Selfish" (2024)	"Million Dollar Baby" (2024)	"Devil Is a Lie" (2024)

Music video
- "Million Dollar Baby" on YouTube

"Million Dollar Baby" is a song by American singer and songwriter Tommy Richman. It was released on April 26, 2024, through ISO Supremacy, PULSE Records and Concord with distribution by Universal Music Group. It was written by Richman with production credits from Max Vossberg, Jonah Roy, MannyVelli, Sparkheem, Kavi, and Gidi. The song became the longest running number-one song on the TikTok Billboard Top 50 chart, staying at the top spot for ten consecutive weeks starting in May 2024.

With minimal established commercial history prior, Richman revealed snippets of the song on TikTok. Building on the teasers' popularity, "Million Dollar Baby" garnered immediate commercial success upon its April release, becoming Richman's breakthrough hit. "Million Dollar Baby" debuted and peaked at number two on the Billboard Hot 100. Outside of the United States, "Million Dollar Baby" topped the charts in Australia, Latvia, and New Zealand, and peaked within the top ten of the charts in many other countries, including Austria, Canada, Denmark, Ireland, Portugal, Switzerland, and the United Kingdom. Critics acclaimed the song for its unique, catchy sound and Richman's vocals; some deemed it an imminent contender for song of the summer.

== Background ==
After having moved from his hometown of Woodbridge, Virginia to Los Angeles in 2022, Richman quickly garnered attention for his "signature production style" without being confined to "genre labels". In 2023, he was recognized by American musician Brent Faiyaz with whom he embarked on his Fuck the World tour that also exposed him to a larger audience. Richman was then signed to Faiyaz's label Iso Supremacy through a joint venture with Pulse Records as the first signee.

Following a string of single releases under the label, Richman started teasing "Million Dollar Baby" on his social media on April 22, 2024, and posted footage of recording sessions using a "VHS-style recording". The snippet amassed over 9.5 million views on TikTok in less than a week, and helped give it an "explosive debut". Richman described the sound as "palatable and listenable" and referred to it as something he likes and is "interested in". His goal was to "make cool shit for people" and for him. Post-release, the song received continued popularity on the platform: Forbes reported that it had become the soundtrack to several trends, including a dance challenge, "prom transition videos" and "the 'Black wife/girlfriend effect'... videos of Black women showing off how their partners’ styles have evolved since the start of their relationships". "Million Dollar Baby" was featured in the soundtrack for EA Sports' Madden NFL 25 and was added as an emote in Fortnite.

== Composition ==
"Million Dollar Baby" is a "funk-infused" R&B song with hi-hats from Southern trap, synths and a psychedelic sound. It features staccato synth lines, a "ridiculously bouncy" bassline and trap percussion; Richman's multi-tracked vocals range from a "pitched-down chant" to a "soaring falsetto". The song consists of "one verse and two choruses", and is in the key of F-sharp minor with a tempo of 138 BPM. The artist also released a "VHS" mix of the song, emulating the mix of the snippet posted to TikTok, which features a more "blown-out bass".

== Commercial performance ==
"Million Dollar Baby" became Tommy Richman's breakthrough hit, becoming immensely popular on streaming platforms: Billboard reported that the song had gained 4.6 million "on-demand US streams" on its release day (April 26, 2024). On the chart dated May 11, 2024, the song debuted at number 2 on the Billboard Hot 100, with "38 million streams, 302,000 in radio airplay audience and 4,000 sold", behind Taylor Swift and Post Malone's "Fortnight". This became Richman's first entry, setting a record as the highest debut from an artist with no prior history on the chart since "Rich Men North of Richmond" by Oliver Anthony Music the previous year.

"Million Dollar Baby" was also very successful globally, reaching the top five in multiple countries. The song reached number one in New Zealand, Australia and Latvia; number three in the United Kingdom and Canada; number four in Lithuania; and number five in Ireland. Billboard also reported that, following the song's success, the rest of Richman's catalog had received a "gain of 106%" in US streams (in the April 26–29 tracking period). The song is the longest running consecutive number-one song on the TikTok Billboard Top 50, having stayed at the top spot for ten weeks from May to July 2024.

== Critical reception ==
The song was well received by music critics. Jordan Rose of Complex called "Million Dollar Baby" a contender for "Song of the Summer" as Richman delivers his "most electric song so far". Eric Skelton of the same publication praised its concise fullness, likening it to "dessert for dinner"; he also singled out the variety and production of Richman's vocals, commenting that "the Virginia singer layers his own voice on top of itself... in an endearingly self-indulgent way". Likewise, Carl Lamarre at Billboard also thought the track was a "song of the summer" contender with its "funky sound" and "seamless vocal riffs". Lamarre went on to praise the track for its "sticky hook" and "an undeniable bass". Robin Murray of Clash highly praised it for "a ridiculously catchy hook, an effervescent beat, and some of Tommy’s catchiest bars".

Writing for HotNewHipHop, Gabriel Bras Nevares pointed out the "creative blend of classic Southern trap" and "poppy" vocal passages with "melodic leads". Bras Nevares thought the song was the "boiling point" of the "steady build-up" Richman has had experienced up until that point, as he found out a way to "capitalize" on the best aspects of his "unique style". The writer furthermore described it as an "odd mix" between sounding "pretty hard" and "quite sophisticated". Katherine St. Asaph of Stereogum acclaimed "Richman’s falsetto, the Jimmy Jam and Terry Lewis cowbell, and [the song's] slick funk with massive summer jam potential".

=== Year-end lists ===
Critics' year-end rankings of "Million Dollar Baby"
Publication	List	Rank	Ref.
NPR	124 Best Songs of 2024	—N/a	

== Charts ==
=== Weekly charts ===
Weekly chart performance for "Million Dollar Baby"
Chart (2024–2025)	Peak position
Australia (ARIA)	1
Australia Hip Hop/R&B (ARIA)	1
Austria (Ö3 Austria Top 40)	8
Belarus Airplay (TopHit)	85
Belgium (Ultratop 50 Flanders)	43
Brazil Hot 100 (Billboard)	51
Bulgaria Airplay (PROPHON)	7
Canada Hot 100 (Billboard)	3
Canada CHR/Top 40 (Billboard)	5
CIS Airplay (TopHit)	41
CIS Airplay (TopHit) VHS Mix Version	32
Croatia (Billboard)	17
Czech Republic Singles Digital (ČNS IFPI)	14
Denmark (Tracklisten)	7
Estonia Airplay (TopHit)	33
Finland (Suomen virallinen lista)	31
France (SNEP)	44
Germany (GfK)	11
Global 200 (Billboard)	1
Greece International Streaming (IFPI)	8
Hungary (Single Top 40)	12
Iceland (Tónlistinn)	1
India International Streaming (IMI)	11
Ireland (IRMA)	5
Israel (Mako Hitlist)	46
Italy (FIMI)	88
Kazakhstan Airplay (TopHit)	23
Latvia Airplay (LaIPA)	16
Latvia Streaming (LaIPA)	1
Lithuania (AGATA)	4
Luxembourg (Billboard)	8
Malaysia (Billboard)	6
Malaysia International Streaming (RIM)	9
Netherlands (Single Top 100)	15
New Zealand (Recorded Music NZ)	1
Nigeria (TurnTable Top 100)	68
Norway (VG-lista)	4
Philippines (Billboard)	4
Poland (Polish Streaming Top 100)	16
Portugal (AFP)	8
Romania (Billboard)	11
Singapore (RIAS)	3
Slovakia Singles Digital (ČNS IFPI)	5
South Africa Streaming (TOSAC)	2
South Korea (Circle)	116
Sweden (Sverigetopplistan)	15
Switzerland (Schweizer Hitparade)	6
United Arab Emirates (IFPI)	4
Ukraine Airplay (TopHit)	177
UK Singles (Official Charts)	3
UK Indie (Official Charts)	1
US Billboard Hot 100	2
US Adult Pop Airplay (Billboard)	12
US Hot R&B/Hip-Hop Songs (Billboard)	1
US Pop Airplay (Billboard)	1
US Rhythmic Airplay (Billboard)	1

=== Monthly charts ===
Monthly chart performance for "Million Dollar Baby"
Chart (2024)	Position
CIS Airplay (TopHit)	42
CIS Airplay (TopHit) VHS Mix Version	61
Estonia Airplay (TopHit)	79
Kazakhstan Airplay (TopHit)	53
Lithuania Airplay (TopHit)	16
South Korea (Circle)	122

=== Year-end charts ===
2024 year-end chart performance
Chart (2024)	Position
Australia (ARIA)	10
Australia Hip Hop/R&B (ARIA)	1
Austria (Ö3 Austria Top 40)	69
Canada (Canadian Hot 100)	12
CIS Airplay (TopHit)	176
Denmark (Tracklisten)	82
Germany (GfK)	81
Global 200 (Billboard)	13
Iceland (Tónlistinn)	25
New Zealand (Recorded Music NZ)	3
Philippines (Philippines Hot 100)	36
Portugal (AFP)	112
Switzerland (Schweizer Hitparade)	56
UK Singles (OCC)	29
US Billboard Hot 100	8
US Adult Top 40 (Billboard)	41
US Hot R&B/Hip-Hop Songs (Billboard)	3
US Mainstream Top 40 (Billboard)	13
US Rhythmic (Billboard)	6
US R&B/Hip-Hop Airplay (Billboard)	9

2025 year-end chart performance
Chart (2025)	Position
Australia (ARIA)	100
Global 200 (Billboard)	158
US Hot R&B/Hip-Hop Songs (Billboard)	51

== Certifications ==
Certifications for "Million Dollar Baby"
Region	Certification	Certified units/sales
Australia (ARIA)	5× Platinum	350,000^{‡}
Austria (IFPI Austria)	Gold	15,000^{‡}
Belgium (BRMA)	Gold	20,000^{‡}
Brazil (Pro-Música Brasil)	2× Diamond	320,000^{‡}
Canada (Music Canada)	5× Platinum	400,000^{‡}
Denmark (IFPI Danmark)	Gold	45,000^{‡}
France (SNEP)	Gold	100,000^{‡}
New Zealand (RMNZ)	5× Platinum	150,000^{‡}
Poland (ZPAV)	Gold	25,000^{‡}
Portugal (AFP)	Platinum	10,000^{‡}
Spain (Promusicae)	Gold	30,000^{‡}
United Kingdom (BPI)	Platinum	600,000^{‡}
United States (RIAA)	6× Platinum	6,000,000^{‡}
Streaming
Greece (IFPI Greece)	Platinum	2,000,000^{†}
^{‡} Sales+streaming figures based on certification alone.^{†} Streaming-only figures based on certification alone.
