= Suicideboys =

American hip-hop duo

- Suicideboys' logo

Background information
- Also known as: $B
- Origin: New Orleans, Louisiana, U.S.
- Genres: Punk rap; emo rap; cloud rap; trap
- Years active: 2013–present
- Labels: G*59; The Orchard (current); Caroline (former)
- Members: Scott "Scrim" Arceneaux Jr.; Aristos "Ruby da Cherry" Petrou
- Website: g59records.com

Suicideboys (stylized as $uicideboy$) is an American hip-hop duo from New Orleans, Louisiana. Suicideboys were founded in 2013 by cousins Scott "Scrim" Arceneaux Jr. and Aristos "Ruby da Cherry" Petrou. The duo rose to popularity on SoundCloud via their abrasive, self-produced beats, harsh lyrical content, and music videos and themes prominently featuring substance abuse and suicidal ideation. They own and operate their own label, G*59 Records, under which all of their music is distributed by The Orchard.

The duo is one of the most popular acts in the underground rap scene. After several years of solely releasing EPs and mixtapes, Suicideboys' debut studio album I Want to Die in New Orleans was released on September 7, 2018. It fared well commercially, becoming their first top-ten album on the US Billboard 200. In May 2019, they released their collaborative six-track EP with Blink-182 drummer Travis Barker entitled Live Fast, Die Whenever, which also featured Korn guitarist James Shaffer.

== Early years and formation ==
Scott Anthony Arceneaux Jr. was born on April 11, 1989, in Marrero, Louisiana. Arceneaux originally was inspired by T-Pain and Lou Reed to produce music, buying his first laptop which he used to start DJing with money gained from selling drugs. Arceneaux’s passion for DJing extended when he started to attend Delgado Community College, where he was hired to DJ parties. He also worked selling used furniture, getting fired for his new hand tattoos after three years.

Aristos Norman Petrou was born on April 22, 1990, to an American mother and Greek Cypriot father Pavlos Petrou, a former soccer head coach at Mount Carmel Academy who arrived in the country after obtaining an athletic scholarship to the University of New Orleans. Raised in Metairie, Louisiana, Petrou's interest in music began when he was seven, playing violin and then drums when he was ten, eventually joining bands in middle school. Petrou graduated from college in 2013. He worked at his father's restaurant as a waiter, a job he held until 2015. His experience with the punk rock scene continued as he joined the band Vapo-Rats as its drummer; however, disillusioned with the apathy his bandmates showed towards the future of the band, Petrou left in order to pursue his career with Arceneaux.

Petrou and Arceneaux are first cousins and shared a close relationship since childhood. Realizing that both were interested in taking a musical career seriously, and both dissatisfied with the direction of their lives, the two formed Suicideboys, making a pact that if their musical career did not work out, they would both kill themselves. Elaborating on this in an interview with Mass Appeal, Arceneaux states that "it was pretty much like cutting the hand, bleeding, and making a pact that there's no plan B, that if this doesn't happen by the time we're 30, I'm blowing my head off".

== Musical career ==
=== 2014–2017: Formation and popularity ===
The duo's first project together, a three-track EP named Kill Yourself Part I: The $uicide $aga, was released in June 2014 on SoundCloud and Bandcamp, attracting attention for their collaboration with notable underground rapper Bones. In the following months, the duo released a further nine iterations of the Kill Yourself series. After a number of collaboration EPs with fellow underground artist Black Smurf, their first full-length project titled Gray/Grey was released on March 3, 2015.

Suicideboys' underground breakthrough came with the release of 2015 EP $outh $ide $uicide, a collaboration with established South Florida rapper Pouya, which thrust the duo into the underground rap spotlight. The duo's first foray onto the mainstream music charts came with the release of Radical $uicide in the summer of 2016. The five-track EP, produced by EDM musician Getter, peaked at number 17 on the Billboard Rap charts.

=== 2018–2020: I Want to Die in New Orleans, alleged separation, Live Fast, Die Whenever, and Grey Day ===
On September 7, 2018, their debut studio album I Want to Die in New Orleans was released. A statement posted by the duo's official Instagram account stated, "We started recording this album at the beginning of 2017. Initially, we wanted to write about our experiences on the road and express how our lives had become slightly more extravagant."

Suicideboys have gained a cult following in the hip-hop scene, in part due to their niche subject matter involving subjects scarcely seen in rap such as suicidal ideation and depression. As of August 2023, their most viewed music video on YouTube is for their song "Paris", with 184 million views. Their most streamed song on Spotify as of August 2023, is "...And to Those I Love, Thanks for Sticking Around" with 544 million streams. The duo were featured in Billboard's list titled "Billboard Dance's 15 Artists to Watch in 2017".

In late 2018, a rumor arose that the group had broken up following a series of ominous tweets. However, they soon clarified that the tweets were in relation to "personal issues" facing Arceneaux and that they had in fact not broken up.

In May 2019, the group put this rumor to rest with the release of their six-track EP Live Fast, Die Whenever in collaboration with Blink-182 drummer Travis Barker, and prominently featuring Korn guitarist James Shaffer.

In July 2019, the duo started their first nationwide "Grey Day Tour", with guests Germ, City Morgue, Trash Talk, Denzel Curry, Shoreline Mafia, Night Lovell, Pouya, and Turnstile as openers. The tour started with a show on July 24, 2019, at the WaMu Theater in Seattle, Washington, and ended on August 23, 2019, after a show at the Shrine Expo Hall in Los Angeles, California.

=== 2021–present: Long Term Effects of Suffering, Sing Me a Lullaby, My Sweet Temptation, and following success ===
In August 2021, after a hiatus of over a year during which both became sober, the duo released their second studio album Long Term Effects of Suffering. The album was received well by their fans while being divisive in general media. Shortly after the release of the album, the duo began the Grey Day Tour 2021 along with other members of G*59, and with other artists, like Slowthai, Turnstile, and Yung Gravy.

In November 2021, the duo was awarded their first RIAA platinum single, as their hit song "...And to Those I Love, Thanks for Sticking Around" reached one million sales.

In July 2022, the third studio album and 47th project from the duo, Sing Me a Lullaby, My Sweet Temptation, its tracklist and covers were all announced on June 2, 2022, via an Instagram post. On November 27, 2022, the duo alongside fellow G59 member, Germ, announced DirtiestNastiest$uicide, a third and final addition to their DN$ trilogy. They also announced the release date for the EP to be on December 16, 2022. On December 1, 2022, they released a single for the upcoming EP called "My Swisher Sweet, But My Sig Sauer". On December 16, 2022, the duo officially released DirtiestNastiest$uicide to streaming services, and lyric videos to their YouTube. On December 13, 2022, the duo announced a European Tour to go from March 6, 2023, to March 26, 2023. The tour featured other artists, like Ski Mask the Slump God, and other G59 artists, like Germ, Shakewell, and Chetta.

In May 2023, the duo released a series of four YIN YANG TAPES extended play mixtapes. The mixtapes took elements from 90's Memphis rap. The first installation, YIN YANG TAPES: Spring Season (1989–1990), was released on May 5, 2023. The second installment in the series, YIN YANG TAPES: Summer Season (1989–1990), was released on May 12, 2023, featuring Ghostemane on the track "Bloody 98". The third tape, YIN YANG TAPES: Fall Season (1989–1990), was released on May 19, 2023, featuring Freddie Dredd on the track "Provolone & Heroin". The fourth and final tape, YIN YANG TAPES: Winter Season (1989–1990), was released on May 26, 2023. On May 19, 2023, the duo announced the 4th year of their annual tour "Grey Day" to go from August 25, 2023, to October 30, 2023. Grey Day 2023 brings other artists Ramirez, City Morgue, Ghostemane, Freddie Dredd, and Sematary.

On July 27, 2023, the duo announced their single "Kill Yourself (Part IV)" is officially released to streaming platforms. On August 9, 2023, the duo posted an announcement for their upcoming EP I No Longer Fear the Razor Guarding My Heel (V), which released on August 11, 2023. On December 11, 2023, the duo announced a tour of Australia and New Zealand in March 2024. The tour featured other artists, like Ghostemane, Pouya, Germ and Shakewell. The tour passed through cities such as Auckland, Brisbane, Melbourne and Sydney.

On March 11, 2024, the duo announced their fourth album titled New World Depression, which was released on June 14. On April 3, 2024, the duo announced the fifth year of their annual Grey Day tour, featuring fellow G59 member Shakewell and other artists including Pouya, Denzel Curry, Haarper and Ekkstacy. The tour passed through the United States and Canada.

On April 3, 2025, the duo announced that year's Grey Day tour, including G59 members Night Lovell, Germ, and Chetta, as well as guest artists Bones and Joeyy. It began on August 5, 2025 in West Palm Beach, Florida, and concluded on October 11 in New Orleans. A month later, the duo released the first single from their studio album Thy Kingdom Come, titled "Self-Inflicted". The album was released on August 1, 2025, with the second single "Now and at the Hour of Our Death" featuring Bones, releasing on June 20.

On December 24, 2025, fans of the duo began sharing images through social media of the unannounced project Thy Will Be Done, which released the following day on December 25.

On March 31, 2026, the duo announced that year's Grey Day tour, including G59 member Shakewell, as well as guest artists Destroy Lonely, Shoreline Mafia, Drain, Slim Gucci, and Black Kray, and concluded October 20th.

=== Side projects ===
Along with their work in Suicideboys, Petrou and Arceneaux have both released sporadic solo work as well as their collaborations with other artists.

Before Suicideboys, Arceneaux was an aspiring solo hip-hop artist, releasing several mixtapes under the name Scrim. These include Narcotics Anonymous, #DrugFlow and Patron Saint of Everything Totally Fucked, all of which were released before the group's formation in 2014. Arceneaux has also worked as an in-house producer for Universal/Republic, producing several songs for artists, including one song that was commercially successful. In 2020, he released his first solo album since the formation of Suicideboys. The album, A Man Rose from the Dead, received mixed reviews among fans. Starting near the end of 2023 and in to early 2024, Arceneaux released several teasers for a new solo album, often in western styled outifts. Finally, in late January 2024, he unveiled the album, titled Lonely Boy. The release date was set on February 2, and was subsequently released with a track list of 26 song. 2 weeks later on February 16, a deluxe edition of the album was released. This version added 18 more songs for a total of a 44 song track listing.

Petrou has released two solo mixtapes under the name Oddy Nuff da Snow Leopard; The Jefe Tape in 2012 and Pluto in 2014. Pluto contained the first collaboration between Arceneaux and Petrou on a commercial project; Arceneaux was featured on the song Smoke a Sack. In 2023, Petrou released his first solo album in nine years titled tragic love songs to study to [vol. 5], under the persona Duckboy. The album takes a punk rock vibe similar to the tracks he released with his former band Vapo-Rats in the early-2010s. Petrou's second album, existential hymns for the average sigma (vol. 9), was released in December of the same year. He also went on to release a third album on April 18th 2025, titled coping strategies to combat the algorithm.

== Controversies ==
Suicideboys have come under much criticism for their often abrasive and offensive image, including their name, lyrical content, and behavior. Many of their songs contain themes and insinuations of devil worship; however, as Arceneaux states in an interview with No Jumper, their use of Satanic imagery is simply a metonym for the negative effects of money, drugs, and other items that have the potential to manipulate people, and a dislike for organized religion.

In September 2016, record producer Deadmau5 accused the duo of copyright infringement following the success of their song "Antarctica" (off of the 2016 mixtape Dark Side of the Clouds). The song samples parts of Deadmau5's "I Remember", with Kaskade; the DJ lambasted the duo for this, claiming that Suicideboys were "publicizing other people's intellectual property without consent". The song, which had been out since January and subsequently reached millions of plays on both YouTube and SoundCloud, was taken down by $uicideboy$ on both platforms and no further action was taken. However, in time for their upcoming Grey Day Tour 2021, "Antarctica" was cleared for streaming after nearly four years of being off streaming services in September 2021.

== Musical style ==
The music of Suicideboys varies between different subgenres of rap; while some songs have melancholy tones with lyrical content that focuses on subjects such as depression and suicidal ideation (topics not widely exposed in rap music), others are wildly aggressive, with themes of violence and sexual content. Some of their music is based around life growing up in New Orleans; song titles such as Audubon, Tulane, Elysian Fields and St. Bernard reflect streets and neighborhoods that influenced the lives of Arceneaux and Petrou.

There is a clear Three 6 Mafia influence in much of their music, with many earlier Suicideboys songs using samples from the group's songs, most notably in Mask & Da Glock. While the use of Three 6 Mafia has been met with reservations by some of its former members, particularly Gangsta Boo, it has been embraced by others; founding member Juicy J has been vocal about his support and mentorship of Suicideboys and enlisted the duo to produce his mixtapes Highly Intoxicated and ShutDaF*kUp, featuring artists such as ASAP Rocky, Cardi B, Wiz Khalifa, and XXXTentacion.

A large portion of their music focuses on depression and its symptoms, an angle not often received in mainstream hip-hop; Arceneaux elaborated on this in an interview with Mass Appeal, stating, "A lot of people take it as emo, or depressed music, or negative music... it's really just connecting. It's therapy, through music".

Excluding occasional guest producers and usage of purchased instrumental loops (especially from the website "Big Citi Loops"), the entirety of Suicideboys' discography is self-produced, primarily by Arceneaux under his pseudonym Budd Dwyer (an homage to the politician of the same name). Arceneaux has produced tracks for multiple artists, including Denzel Curry, Dash, and Juicy J; additionally, he states that he once held an in-house deal with Universal/Republic.

== Personal lives ==
=== Drug addiction ===
Both Arceneaux and Petrou have struggled with drug addiction. Arceneaux revealed in a No Jumper interview that at one point in his life he would lure people to him on Craigslist in order to rob them just to feed his addiction. Arceneaux states that he has been sober since February 2019 and maintains his sobriety by attending twelve-step programs and therapy sessions. In October 2020, following an intervention by their management, Petrou checked himself into a drug rehabilitation facility and claims to have "remained sober" despite smoking marijuana.

== Discography ==
=== Studio albums ===
Title	Details	Peak chart positions									Sales	Certifications
Title	Details	US	AUS	BEL (FL)	CAN	FIN	GER	NLD	NZ	SWI	Sales	Certifications
I Want to Die in New Orleans	Released: September 7, 2018; Label: G*59; Format: Digital download, streaming, CD, vinyl, cassette	9	10	44	26	6	89	74	15	87	US: 31,000	RIAA: Gold; RMNZ: Gold
Long Term Effects of Suffering	Released: August 13, 2021; Label: G*59; Formats: Digital download, streaming, CD, vinyl	7	18	76	26	12	61	—	8	29		RIAA: Gold; RMNZ: Gold
Sing Me a Lullaby, My Sweet Temptation	Released: July 29, 2022; Label: G*59; Format: Digital download, streaming, CD, vinyl, cassette	7	42	155	26	14	47	—	6	51		RIAA: Platinum; RMNZ: Gold
New World Depression	Released: June 14, 2024; Label: G*59; Format: Digital download, streaming, CD, vinyl	5	6	58	12	11	14	67	3	27		RIAA: Gold; RMNZ: Gold
Thy Kingdom Come	Released: August 1, 2025; Label: G*59; Format: Digital download, streaming, CD, vinyl	4	21	169	23	25	60	—	6	24		
Thy Will Be Done	Released: December 25, 2025; Label: G*59; Format: Digital download, streaming, CD, vinyl	21	32	—	51	—	—	—	10	84		

=== Charted EPs ===
Title	Details	Peak chart positions						
Title	Details	US	US R&B/HH	US Ind.	US Heat	CAN	FIN	NZ
Radical $uicide (with Getter)	Released: July 22, 2016; Label: G*59; Format: Digital download, streaming	—	17	20	5	—	—	—
DirtiestNastiest$uicide (with Germ)	Released: December 16, 2022; Label: G*59; Format: Digital download, streaming	54	21	6	—	94	30	33
Shameless $uicide (with Shakewell)	Released: February 24, 2023; Label: G*59; Format: Digital download, streaming	50	25	10	—	—	39	39
Yin Yang Tapes: Spring Season (1989–1990)	Released: May 5, 2023; Label: G*59; Format: Digital download, streaming, cassette	—	—	43	—	—	—	—

=== Other EPs ===
==== 2014 ====
- Kill Your$elf Part I: The $uicide $aga
- Kill Your$elf Part II: The Black $uede $aga
- Kill Your$elf Part III: The Budd Dwyer $aga
- Kill Your$elf Part IV: The Trill Clinton $aga
- Kill Your$elf Part V: The Fuck Bitche$, Get Death $aga
- Kill Your$elf Part VI: The T$unami $aga
- Kill Your$elf Part VII: The Fuck God $aga

==== 2015 ====
- Kill Your$elf Part VIII: The $eppuku $aga
- Kill Your$elf Part IX: The $oul$eek $aga
- Kill Your$elf Part X: The Re$urrection $aga
- Black $uicide (w/ Black Smurf)
- Black $uicide Side B: $uicide Hustle (w/ Black Smurf)
- G.R.E.Y.G.O.D.S. (w/ Ramirez)
- Grey Sheep
- I No Longer Fear the Razor Guarding My Heel
- Black $uicide Side C: The Seventh Seal (w/ Black Smurf)
- $outh $ide $uicide (w/ Pouya)
- I No Longer Fear the Razor Guarding My Heel (II)

==== 2016 ====
- G.R.E.Y.G.O.D.S.I.I. (w/ Ramirez)
- DirtyNasty$uicide (w/ Germ)
- Grey Sheep II
- I No Longer Fear the Razor Guarding My Heel (III)

==== 2017 ====
- DirtierNastier$uicide (w/ Germ)
- Kill Yourself Part XI: The Kingdom Come Saga
- Kill Yourself Part XII: The Dark Glacier Saga
- Kill Yourself Part XIII: The Atlantis Saga
- Kill Yourself Part XIV: The Vulture Saga
- Kill Yourself Part XV: The Coast of Ashes Saga
- Kill Yourself Part XVI: The Faded Stains Saga
- Kill Yourself Part XVII: The Suburban Sacrifice Saga
- Kill Yourself Part XVIII: The Fall of Idols Saga
- Kill Yourself Part XIX: The Deep End Saga
- Kill Yourself Part XX: The Infinity Saga

==== 2019 ====
- Live Fast, Die Whenever (w/ Travis Barker)

==== 2023 ====
- Yin Yang Tapes: Summer Season (1989–1990)
- Yin Yang Tapes: Fall Season (1989–1990)
- Yin Yang Tapes: Winter Season (1989–1990)
- I No Longer Fear the Razor Guarding My Heel (V)

=== Mixtapes ===
- Gray/Grey (2015)
- 7th or St. Tammany (2015)
- YungDeathLilLife (2015)
- High Tide in the Snake's Nest (2015)
- My Liver Will Handle What My Heart Can't (2015)
- Now the Moon's Rising (2015)
- Dark Side of the Clouds (2016)
- Eternal Grey (2016)
- Stop Staring at the Shadows (2020)

=== Singles ===
List of singles, with selected chart positions and certifications, showing year released and album name
Title	Year	Peak chart positions						Certifications	Album
Title	Year	US	US R&B/HH	CAN	FIN Stream	NZ Hot	WW	Certifications	Album
"Runnin' Thru the 7th with My Woadies"	2015	—	—	—	—	—	—	RIAA: 2× Platinum; RMNZ: Platinum	$outh $ide $uicide
"Kill Yourself (Part III)"	2015	—	—	—	—	—	—	RIAA: Gold; BPI: Silver; RMNZ: 2× Platinum	My Liver Will Handle What My Heart Can't
"Fuckthepopulation"	2015	—	—	—	—	—	—	RMNZ: Gold	My Liver Will Handle What My Heart Can't
"Paris"	2015	—	—	—	—	—	—	RIAA: Gold; RMNZ: 2× Platinum	Now the Moon's Rising
"Antarctica"	2016	—	—	—	—	—	—	RIAA: Platinum; RMNZ: Platinum	Dark Side of the Clouds
"Kill Yourself (Part IV)"	2016	—	—	—	—	—	—		Non-album single
"For the Last Time"	2017	—	—	—	—	—	—	RMNZ: Platinum	Kill Yourself Part XX: The Infinity Saga
"2nd Hand"	2017	—	—	—	—	—	—	RIAA: Gold; RMNZ: Platinum	Kill Yourself Part XII: The Dark Glacier Saga
"Fuckallofyou2k18"	2018	—	—	—	—	—	—		Non-album singles
"Either Hated or Ignored"	2018	—	—	—	—	—	—		Non-album singles
"Carrollton"	2018	—	—	—	—	—	—	RIAA: Gold; RMNZ: Platinum	I Want to Die in New Orleans
"Meet Mr. Niceguy"	2018	—	—	—	32	—	—		I Want to Die in New Orleans
"Hung Up on the Come Up"	2018	—	—	—	—	—	—		Non-album singles
"Scrape"	2018	—	—	—	—	—	—		Non-album singles
"Nothingleftnothingleft"	2019	—	—	—	—	—	—		Live Fast, Die Whenever
"Aliens Are Ghosts"	2019	—	—	—	—	—	—		Live Fast, Die Whenever
"Scope Set"	2019	—	—	—	—	—	—		Stop Staring at the Shadows
"Fuck Your Culture"	2019	—	—	—	—	—	—		Stop Staring at the Shadows
"...And to Those I Love, Thanks for Sticking Around"	2020	— (Note: "...And to Those I Love, Thanks for Sticking Around" did not enter the Billboard Hot 100, but peaked at number 5 on the Bubbling Under Hot 100 chart.)	46	—	—	35	128	RIAA: 3× Platinum; BPI: Silver; RMNZ: 2× Platinum	Stop Staring at the Shadows
"New Profile Pic"	2021	—	—	—	—	—	—		Long Term Effects of Suffering
"Avalon"	2021	—	—	—	—	15	—	RMNZ: Gold	Long Term Effects of Suffering
"Materialism as a Means to an End"	2021	—	—	—	—	15	—		Long Term Effects of Suffering
"The Evil That Men Do"	2022	—	—	—	—	17	—		Sing Me a Lullaby, My Sweet Temptation
"Escape from Babylon"	2022	— (Note: "Escape from Babylon" did not enter the Billboard Hot 100, but peaked at number 22 on the Bubbling Under Hot 100 chart.)	—	—	—	13	—		Sing Me a Lullaby, My Sweet Temptation
"My Swisher Sweet, but My Sig Sauer" (with Germ)	2022	— (Note: "My Swisher Sweet, but My Sig Sauer" did not enter the Billboard Hot 100, but peaked at number 14 on the Bubbling Under Hot 100 chart.)	—	—	—	15	—		DirtiestNastiest$uicide
"Big Shot Cream Soda" (with Shakewell)	2023	— (Note: "Big Shot Cream Soda" did not enter the Billboard Hot 100, but peaked at number 14 on the Bubbling Under Hot 100 chart.)	—	—	—	30	—		Shameless $uicide
"Us vs. Them"	2024	96	26	85	—	7	—	RMNZ: Gold	New World Depression
"Are You Going to See the Rose in the Vase, or the Dust on the Table"	2024	— (Note: "Are You Going to See the Rose in the Vase, or the Dust on the Table" did not enter the Billboard Hot 100, but peaked at number 6 on the Bubbling Under Hot 100 chart.)	33	—	—	8	—		New World Depression
"The Thin Grey Line"	2024	71	20	88	—	3	—		New World Depression
"Self-Inflicted"	2025	—	28	—	—	10	—		Thy Kingdom Come
"Now and at the Hour of Our Death" (featuring Bones)	2025	100	26	—	—	13	—		Thy Kingdom Come

=== Other charted songs ===
Title	Year	Peak chart positions				Album
Title	Year	US	US R&B/HH	CAN	NZ Hot	Album
"All Dogs Go to Heaven"	2020	—	—	—	26	Stop Staring at the Shadows
"Putrid Pride"	2020	—	—	—	32	Stop Staring at the Shadows
"That Just Isn't Empirically Possible"	2020	—	—	—	34	Stop Staring at the Shadows
"If Self-Destruction Was an Olympic Event, I'd Be Tonya Harding"	2021	—	—	—	26	Long Term Effects of Suffering
"Life Is but a Stream~"	2021	—	—	—	21	Long Term Effects of Suffering
"5 Grand at 8 to 1"	2021	—	—	—	28	Long Term Effects of Suffering
"Ugliest"	2021	—	—	—	16	Long Term Effects of Suffering
"Genesis"	2022	— (Note: "Genesis" did not enter the Billboard Hot 100, but peaked at number 5 on the Bubbling Under Hot 100 chart.)	41	—	13	Sing Me a Lullaby, My Sweet Temptation
"Matte Black"	2022	— (Note: "Matte Black" did not enter the Billboard Hot 100, but peaked at number 2 on the Bubbling Under Hot 100 chart.)	36	—	10	Sing Me a Lullaby, My Sweet Temptation
"Fucking Your Culture"	2022	— (Note: "Fucking Your Culture" did not enter the Billboard Hot 100, but peaked at number 14 on the Bubbling Under Hot 100 chart.)	49	—	18	Sing Me a Lullaby, My Sweet Temptation
"1000 Blunts"	2022	— (Note: "1000 Blunts" did not enter the Billboard Hot 100, but peaked at number 12 on the Bubbling Under Hot 100 chart.)	45	—	12	Sing Me a Lullaby, My Sweet Temptation
"Sorry for the Delay" (with Germ)	2022	—	—	—	15	DirtiestNastiest$uicide
"Buckhead" (with Germ)	2022	—	—	—	17	DirtiestNastiest$uicide
"I Dream of Chrome" (with Germ)	2022	—	—	—	12	DirtiestNastiest$uicide
"Champagne Face" (with Germ)	2022	—	—	—	13	DirtiestNastiest$uicide
"Shameless $uicide" (with Shakewell)	2023	—	—	—	39	Shameless $uicide
"Whole Lotta Grey" (with Shakewell)	2023	—	—	—	32	Shameless $uicide
"Six Lines, Two Dragons, and a Messiah" (with Shakewell)	2023	—	—	—	33	Shameless $uicide
"Hot Razor"	2023	—	—	—	25	Yin Yang Tapes: Spring Season (1989–1990)
"Realism vs Idealism"	2023	—	—	—	17	Yin Yang Tapes: Spring Season (1989–1990)
"Château Gris"	2023	—	—	—	31	Yin Yang Tapes: Spring Season (1989–1990)
"5 'n the Mornin'"	2023	—	—	—	35	Yin Yang Tapes: Summer Season (1989–1990)
"Bloody 98" (featuring Ghostemane)	2023	—	—	—	14	Yin Yang Tapes: Summer Season (1989–1990)
"Provolone & Heroin" (featuring Freddie Dredd)	2023	—	—	—	35	Yin Yang Tapes: Fall Season (1989–1990)
"Bossier City Kidnap Victims"	2023	—	—	—	40	Yin Yang Tapes: Winter Season (1989–1990)
"Not Even Ghosts Are This Empty"	2023	— (Note: "Not Even Ghosts Are This Empty" did not enter the Billboard Hot 100, but peaked at number 23 on the Bubbling Under Hot 100 chart.)	44	—	9	I No Longer Fear the Razor Guarding My Heel (V)
"Finding Shelter in My Larynx"	2023	—	—	—	13	I No Longer Fear the Razor Guarding My Heel (V)
"A Little Trauma Can Be Illuminating, and I'm Shining Like the Sun"	2023	—	—	—	11	I No Longer Fear the Razor Guarding My Heel (V)
"Lone Wolf Hysteria"	2024	— (Note: "Lone Wolf Hysteria" did not enter the Billboard Hot 100, but peaked at number 1 on the Bubbling Under Hot 100 chart.)	31	—	6	New World Depression
"Mental Clarity Is a Luxury I Can't Afford"	2024	— (Note: "Mental Clarity Is a Luxury I Can't Afford" did not enter the Billboard Hot 100, but peaked at number 10 on the Bubbling Under Hot 100 chart.)	36	—	—	New World Depression
"Thorns"	2024	91	27	—	3	New World Depression
"Misery in Waking Hours"	2024	— (Note: "Misery in Waking Hours" did not enter the Billboard Hot 100, but peaked at number 3 on the Bubbling Under Hot 100 chart.)	32	—	8	New World Depression
"Burgundy"	2024	86	25	—	4	New World Depression
"The Light at the End of the Tunnel for $9.99 a Month"	2024	—	46	—	—	New World Depression
"Count Your Blessings"	2025	90	21	—	6	Thy Kingdom Come
"Napoleon"	2025	54	12	83	2	Thy Kingdom Come
"Oh, What a Wretched Man I Am!"	2025	91	22	—	4	Thy Kingdom Come
"Full of Grace (I Refuse to Tend My Own Grave)"	2025	— (Note: "Full of Grace (I Refuse to Tend My Own Grave)" did not enter the Billboard Hot 100, but peaked at number 4 on the Bubbling Under Hot 100 chart.)	27	—	—	Thy Kingdom Come
"Chain Breaker"	2025	— (Note: "Chain Breaker" did not enter the Billboard Hot 100, but peaked at number 9 on the Bubbling Under Hot 100 chart.)	33	—	—	Thy Kingdom Come
"Grey+Grey+Grey"	2025	— (Note: "Grey+Grey+Grey" did not enter the Billboard Hot 100, but peaked at number 18 on the Bubbling Under Hot 100 chart.)	35	—	—	Thy Kingdom Come
"Carried Away" (featuring Night Lovell)	2025	— (Note: "Carried Away" did not enter the Billboard Hot 100, but peaked at number 8 on the Bubbling Under Hot 100 chart.)	32	—	9	Thy Kingdom Come
"Monochromatic"	2025	—	41	—	—	Thy Kingdom Come
"Leviticus"	2025	86	18	—	2	Thy Will Be Done
"2009 Reggie Bush"	2025	— (Note: "2009 Reggie Bush" did not enter the Billboard Hot 100, but peaked at number 19 on the Bubbling Under Hot 100 chart.)	34	—	4	Thy Will Be Done
"Bloodsweat"	2025	— (Note: "Bloodsweat" did not enter the Billboard Hot 100, but peaked at number 1 on the Bubbling Under Hot 100 chart.)	24	—	3	Thy Will Be Done
"Angel Grove"	2025	—	41	—	—	Thy Will Be Done
"Whatever Floats Your Boat Will Definitely Sink My Ship"	2025	— (Note: "Whatever Floats Your Boat Will Definitely Sink My Ship" did not enter the Billboard Hot 100, but peaked at number 12 on the Bubbling Under Hot 100 chart.)	31	—	5	Thy Will Be Done
"MSY"	2025	—	40	—	—	Thy Will Be Done
"Old Addicts, New Habits"	2025	—	48	—	—	Thy Will Be Done
"Fuck Ups"	2025	—	46	—	—	Thy Will Be Done

=== Guest appearances ===
List of non-single guest appearances, with other performing artists, showing year released and album name
Title	Year	Other performer(s)	Certifications	Album
"Soul"	2014	Chetta		Diary of a Felon
"Cult II"	2014	Queen Michael		—N/a
"$u$hi"	2014	$hroomhead		—N/a
"$uicideWave"	2014	XtheDolphin		—N/a
"Hotline"	2015	Izreal		—N/a
"$ix Feet Deep"	2015	YPH		—N/a
"Lethargy"	2015	J Trauma		—N/a
"G Double O D"	2015	Swag Toof		FOE
"I Met a Witch in the Woods"	2015	Raziah Jones		—N/a
"Dark Cry$tal"	2015	Noah23		Peacock Angel
"666House"	2015	Mike Good		—N/a
"The Invocation"	2015	Wavy Jone$		Beyond the Black Rainbow
"Psychedelic $uicide"	2015	Trez		—N/a
"Hatred"	2015	Smug Mang		Lil Gwoupo
"Seppuku"	2015	Ghostemane, JGrxxn		For the Aspiring Occultist
"Polluted Paradise"	2015	Chetta		Polluted Paradise
"Avant Garde"	2015	JGrxxn, Rozz Dyliams		LilBoxChevyMane
"Avant Garde II"	2015	JGrxxn, Ramirez		Ra
"Make Your Own Way"	2015	Supa Sortahuman		Hate Hate
"Dipped In Gold"	2015	B.C. tha Hybrid		—N/a
"Sarcophagus II"	2015	Ramirez		Meet Me Where the River Turns Grey
"Guillotine"	2016	CP97		—N/a
"Check"	2016	EndyEnds		—N/a
"Fuck Y'all Hoes"	2016	Germ		Bad Shit
"Chamber"	2016	Mikey the Magician		Manifest
"But Wait, There's More"	2016	Pouya		Underground Underdog
"Fat Hoes"	2016	Pouya, SDotBraddy, Germ		Underground Underdog
"Agora"	2016	Yung Dori, Crackhead Jynn		Suspect
"2 Hot 4 U"	2016	Fat Nick		When the Lean Runs Out
"TTYL" (Remix)	2016	Fat Nick, Pouya, Sir Michael Rocks, Robb Banks		When the Lean Runs Out
"I Can't Fold"	2016	Wifisfuneral		Black Heart Revenge
"2 High"	2016	Getter		Wat the Frick
"Depraved $uicide"	2016	Yung Dori		—N/a
"666 Below"	2017	Kold-Blooded		FaceKloud 1.0
"Rukus"	2017	Germ		Bad Shit (Bootleg)
"Suicide Bay"	2017	Mitchell Bay		—N/a
"Grey Gods"	2017	Ramirez	RIAA: Gold; RMNZ: Gold	The Grey Gorilla
"As the Bridges Burn"	2017	Craig Xen		—N/a
"Freaky"	2017	Juicy J, A$AP Rocky		Highly Intoxicated
"Joan of Arc"	2018	Night Lovell	RIAA: Gold; RMNZ: Gold	Goodnight Lovell
"Cutthroat Smile"	2018	Bexey		—N/a
"Awkward Car Drive"	2019	Germ	RIAA: Gold	Germ Has a Deathwish
"Zuccenberg"	2021	Tommy Cash, Diplo		MoneySutra
"Solutions"	2022	Shakewell		Pray 4 Shakewell
"Poydras"	2022	Chetta		Been Here Forever
"Datura"	2023	Various artists		Fast X: Original Soundtrack
"Pulling Up"	2024	Germ		Every Dog Has Its Day

== Solo discography ==
=== Scrim albums ===
Title	Details	Peak chart positions									Sales	Certifications
Title	Details	US	AUS	BEL (FL)	CAN	FIN	GER	NLD	NZ	SWI	Sales	Certifications
A Man Rose from the Dead	Released: May 15, 2020; Label: G*59; Format: Digital download, streaming	—	—	—	—	—	—	—	—	—		
lonely boy	Released: February 2, 2024; Label: G*59; Format: Digital download, streaming	134	—	—	—	—	—	—	—	—		
via crucis	Released: April 18, 2025; Label: G*59; Format: Digital download, streaming	194	—	—	—	—	—	—	—	—		
runaway	Release: May 29, 2026; Label: G*59; Format: Digital download, streaming	134	—	—	—	—	—	—	—	—		

=== Scrim singles ===
Title	Year	Peak chart positions						Certifications	Album
Title	Year	US	US R&B/HH	CAN	FIN Stream	NZ Hot	WW	Certifications	Album
"paradise"	2024	—	—	—	—	—	—		lonely boy
"methamphetamine blues"	2025	—	—	—	—	—	—		via crucis
"cortisol"	2026	—	—		—	—	—		runaway

=== DUCKBOY albums ===
Title	Details	Peak chart positions									Sales	Certifications
Title	Details	US	AUS	BEL (FL)	CAN	FIN	GER	NLD	NZ	SWI	Sales	Certifications
tragic love songs to study to [vol. 5]	Released: July 14, 2023; Label: G*59; Format: Digital download, streaming, vinyl	—	—	—	—	—	—	—	—	—		
existential hymns for the average sigma [vol. 9]	Released: December 15, 2023; Label: G*59; Format: Digital download, streaming, vinyl	—	—	—	—	—	—	—	—	—		
coping strategies to combat the algorithm [vol. 7]	Released: April 18, 2025; Label: G*59; Format: Digital download, streaming, vinyl	—	—	—	—	—	—	—	—	—		
daily reminders to repent from sin [vol. 3]	Released: June 12, 2026; Label: G*59; Format: Digital download, streaming	—	—	—	—	—	—	—	—	—		
