= Wat the Frick =

EP by Getter
- Released: 2 September 2016
- Recorded: 2016
- Genre: Trap; dubstep; bass house; moombahton; chillwave
- Length: 26:48
- Label: Owsla
- Producer: Tanner Petulla

Getter chronology
| Radical Dude! (2016) | Wat the Frick (2016) | Inhalant Abuse (The Remixes) (2017) |

Singles from Wat the Frick EP
- 1. "Wat the Frick" Released: 22 July 2016

Wat the Frick is the ninth extended play by American DJ and electronic producer Getter. Wat the Frick was released on 2 September 2016, by American record label Owsla.

== Background and composition ==
In an interview with Max Chung of Run The Trap, Petulla commented on the difference between Wat The Frick and his previous extended plays, stating:

I think the biggest thing is that – besides Suicideboys rapping on one of the songs – they’re all solo tracks. No collaborations. This EP is essentially revealing to the public what my brain’s been up to. That’s the kind of shit that you can expect, it’s really just everything that I fuck with right now.

In the same interview, Petulla commented on the contrast between his North-American tour titled Wat The Frick Tour and his previous tours, stating:

I’ve always had this idea of doing a tour that isn’t necessarily centered around music, because a lot of people know me for more than that. There’s comedy, characters, other dumb shit involved. I wanna bring those elements to the stage where it’s more of an entertainment tour instead of just a music one. I’m purposefully not having any crazy production or anything – that’s already been done. I think the real work is in the actual show and experience.

== Reception and release ==
Kara Curtin of Relentless Beats stated: "Wat the Frick is the perfect balance between the sound we love and the refreshing sound we needed to hear". Timmy Kusnierek of Your EDM noted the extended play for its distinctive style, stating:

The overarching sound design is a metalloid clanging, seemingly held in vacuum with some seriously percussive ping-back. Getter continues to juxtapose the aggressive nature of dubstep with childlike playfulness for truly unique atmosphere. The entire offering is unapologetically Getter, and anyone who’s had the pleasure of seeing one of his sets knows just how rowdy the whole vibe can get.

Kara Curtin of Relentless Beats praised Something New, stating "At first listen, you’d be surprised the artist behind the airy tune is our grimy Getter, but he proved that he is much more than just a dubstep dude". Brian Bonavoglia commented on the direction Petulla took for Something New, stating "Electronic music’s elitists, snobs or whatever they’re going by these days are going to have something to say about this one, but just remember like most producers, Getter doesn’t need to and will never choose to stick with one genre", later stating "He has chosen to show the world there is much more to the bass producer that we’ve all fallen in love with and he’s certainly caught our attention".

== Track listing ==
| No. | Title | Length |
|---|---|---|
| 1. | "Wat the Frick" (VIP Mix) | 5:19 |
| 2. | "Hecka Tight" | 3:50 |
| 3. | "Fricken Dope" | 4:14 |
| 4. | "Cool as Frick" | 3:10 |
| 5. | "Sick Jet Pack Bro" | 3:41 |
| 6. | "2 High" (featuring Suicideboys) | 2:34 |
| 7. | "Something New" | 4:02 |
| Total length: | | 26:48 |

== Charts ==
| Chart (2016) | Peak position |
|---|---|
| US Top Dance/Electronic Albums (Billboard) | 7 |
| US Heatseekers (Billboard) | 17 |
| US Independent Albums (Billboard) | 46 |
