= List of songs recorded by SZA =

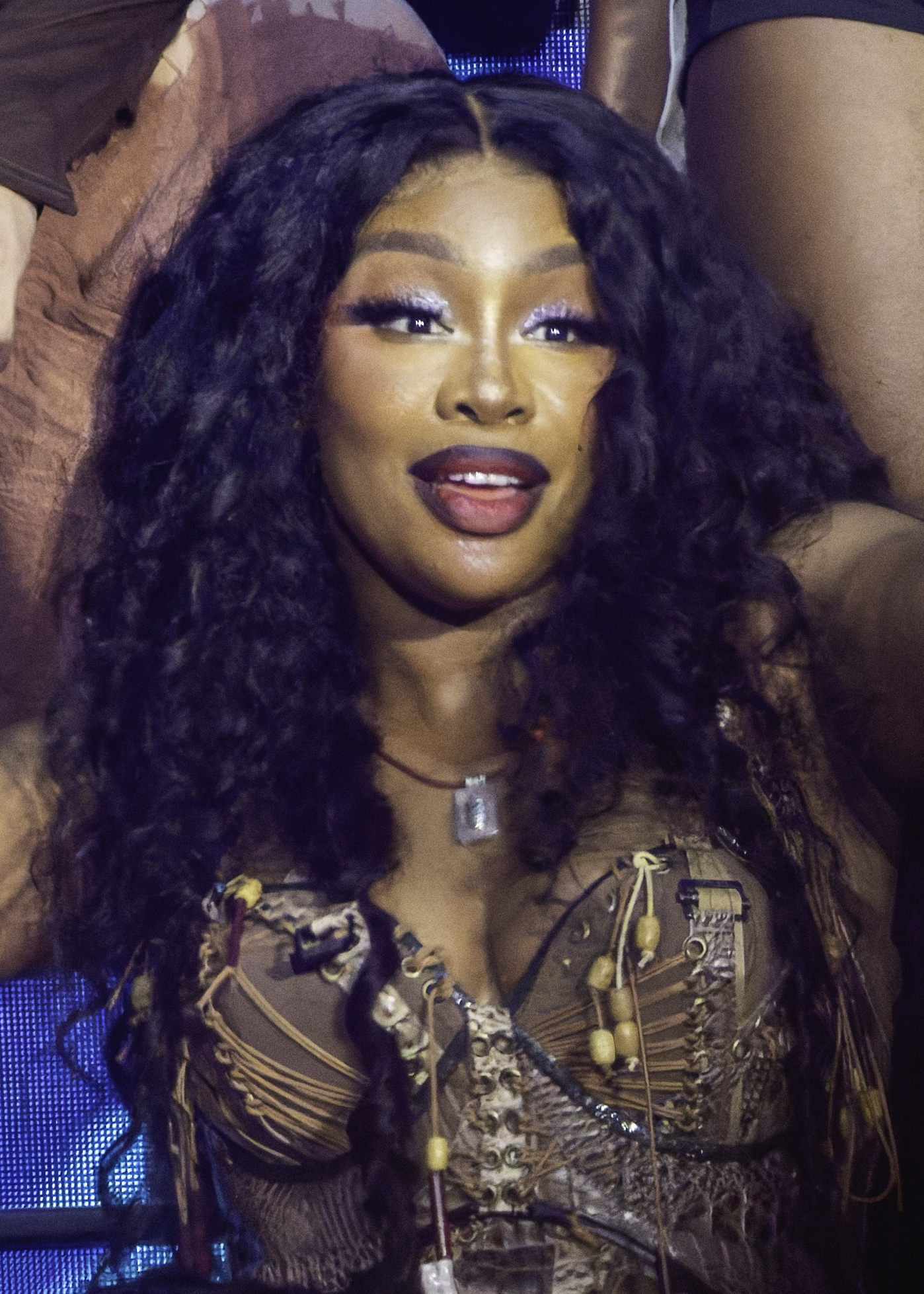
SZA performing at Glastonbury 2024

American singer-songwriter SZA co-writes almost all of her songs with their respective producers; for many of them, she is the sole lyricist. (Note: Punch, president of SZA's label Top Dawg Entertainment, has also clarified that he approves the credits for songs released under the label.) Her repertoire encompasses two studio albums, one reissue album, three extended plays (EPs), multiple film and television soundtracks, and several guest appearances. Psychedelic and lo-fi instrumentals characterize SZA's early songs, and the self-uploaded SoundCloud EPs See.SZA.Run (2012) and S (2013) were her career's first releases. Executives at Top Dawg Entertainment took notice of her SoundCloud music and signed a recording contract with her in 2013. Afterwards, she released her third EP Z (2014).

Three years later, SZA released her debut studio album, Ctrl. Many of the people who contributed to the album were or became frequent collaborators, including Travis Scott, then-labelmate Kendrick Lamar, and producer Carter Lang. Critics have identified Ctrl as primarily an R&B album with elements of jazz and alternative. As time passed, the media started to consistently label SZA as an R&B artist, and she surmised the categorization was due to stereotypes about Black women in music. Wanting to demonstrate her versatility, she incorporated an amalgam of genres on her second album, SOS (2022), such as R&B, rap, rock, and pop. SOS's reissue, Lana (2024), was supported by the singles "Saturn", "BMF", and "30 for 30".

Outside of her albums and EPs, SZA has appeared on dozens of songs by other musicians like Lamar, Isaiah Rashad, and Doja Cat. Her unreleased music comprises a large amount of album outtakes and scrapped verses, many of which have leaked online. She thinks of the aforementioned leakers as thieves, and her label's manager Punch said that these leaks could cause her releases to be postponed or even cancelled.

== Released songs ==
Key
†	Indicates single release
#	Indicates songs with unbilled vocals by SZA

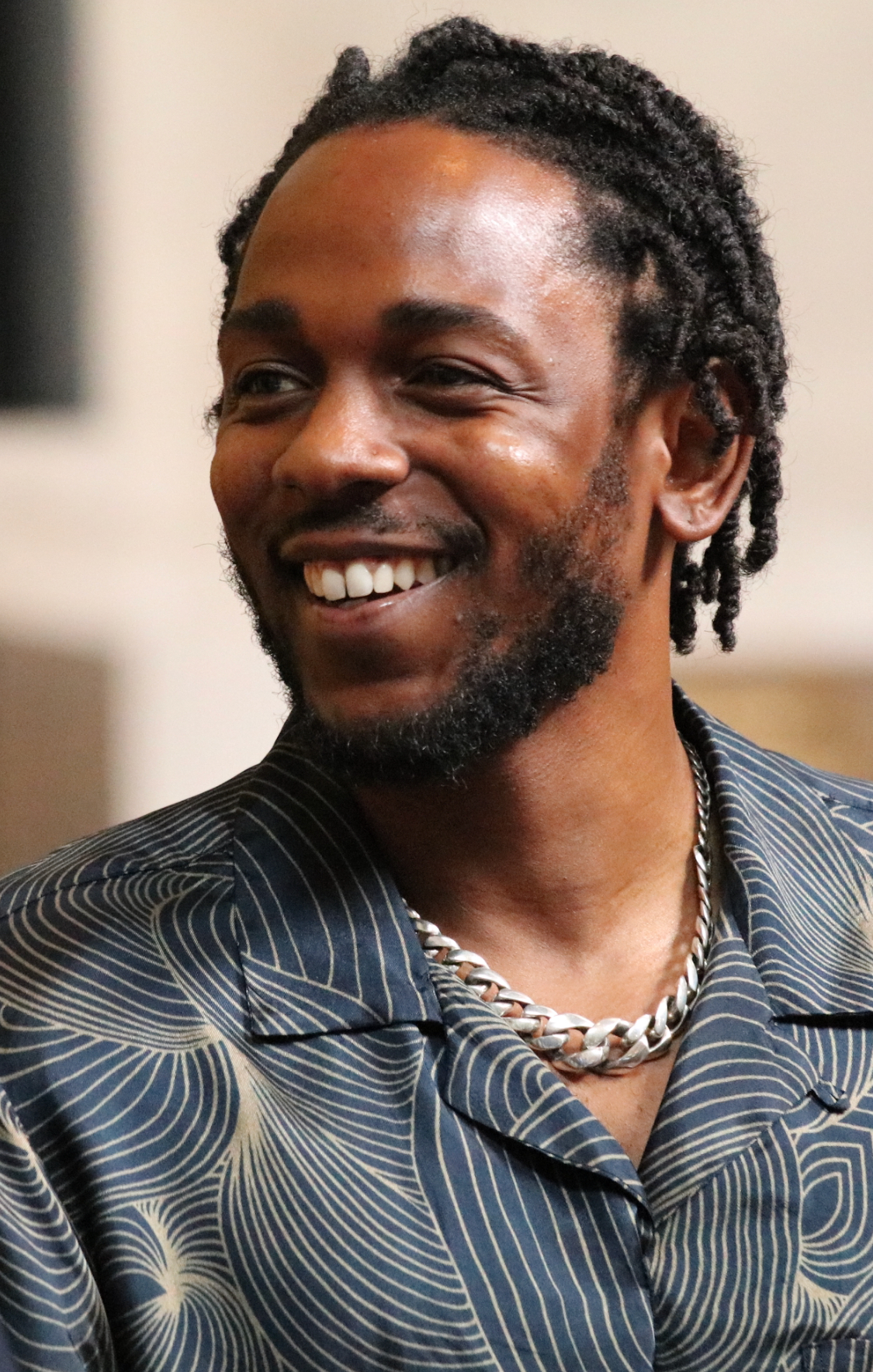
Kendrick Lamar and SZA have appeared on each other's songs since 2014. They are former Top Dawg labelmates.

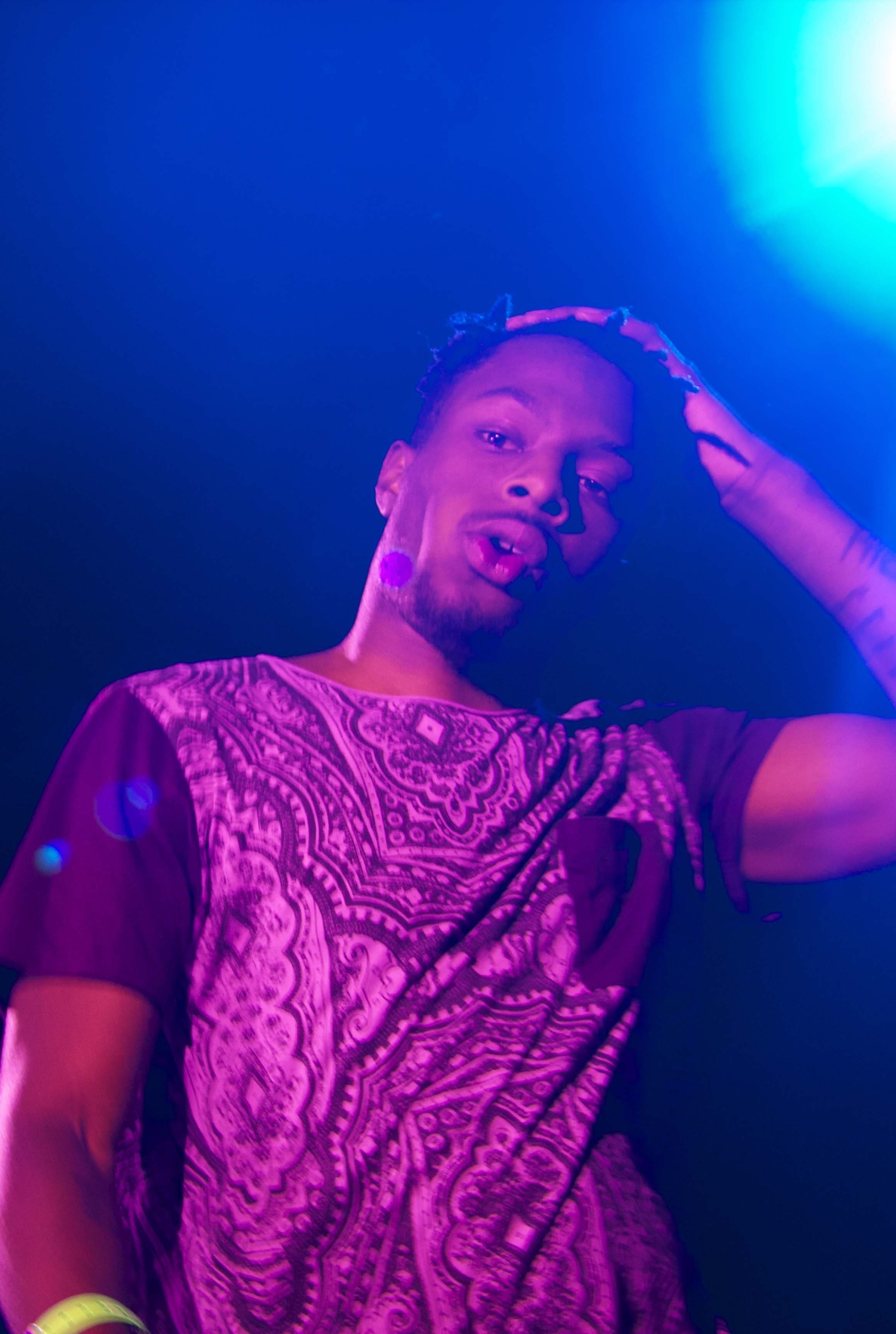
Isaiah Rashad featured on and co-wrote songs from Z and Ctrl. He and SZA are current labelmates.

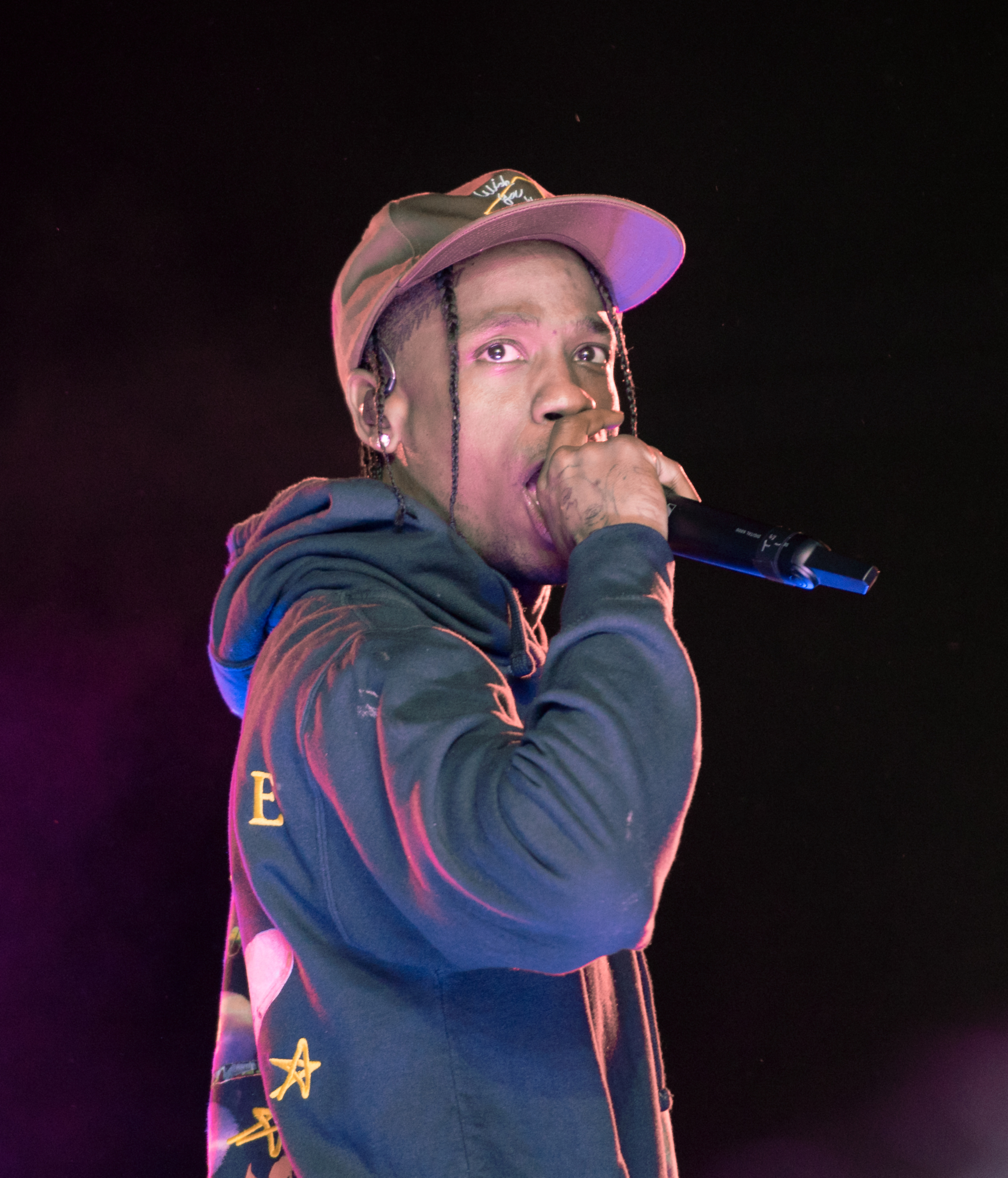
Travis Scott has collaborated with SZA on six songs, such as her single "Love Galore".

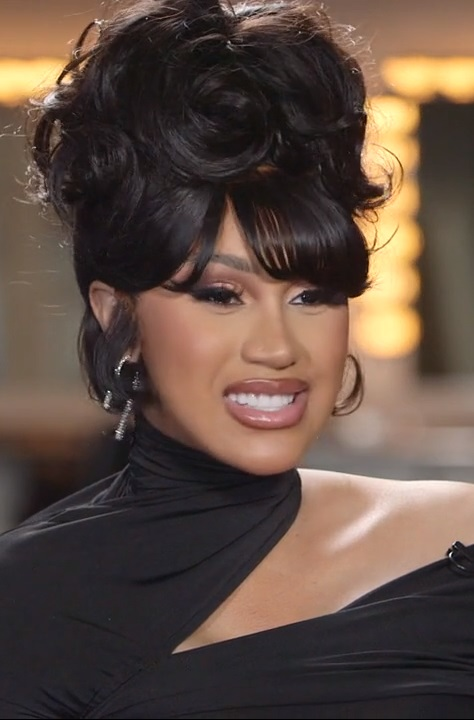
SZA featured on the song "I Do" by Cardi B. The two appeared on versions of Summer Walker's "No Love" and Flo Milli's "Never Lose Me".

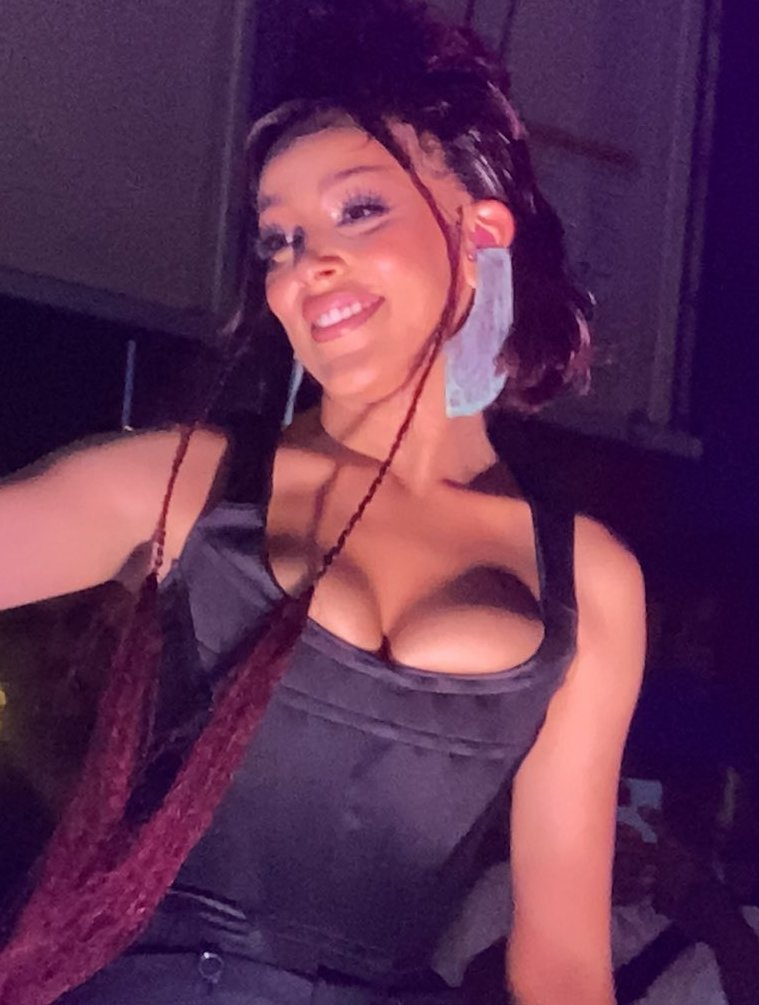
Doja Cat and SZA duetted on "Kiss Me More", the "Kill Bill" remix, and "Take Me Dancing".

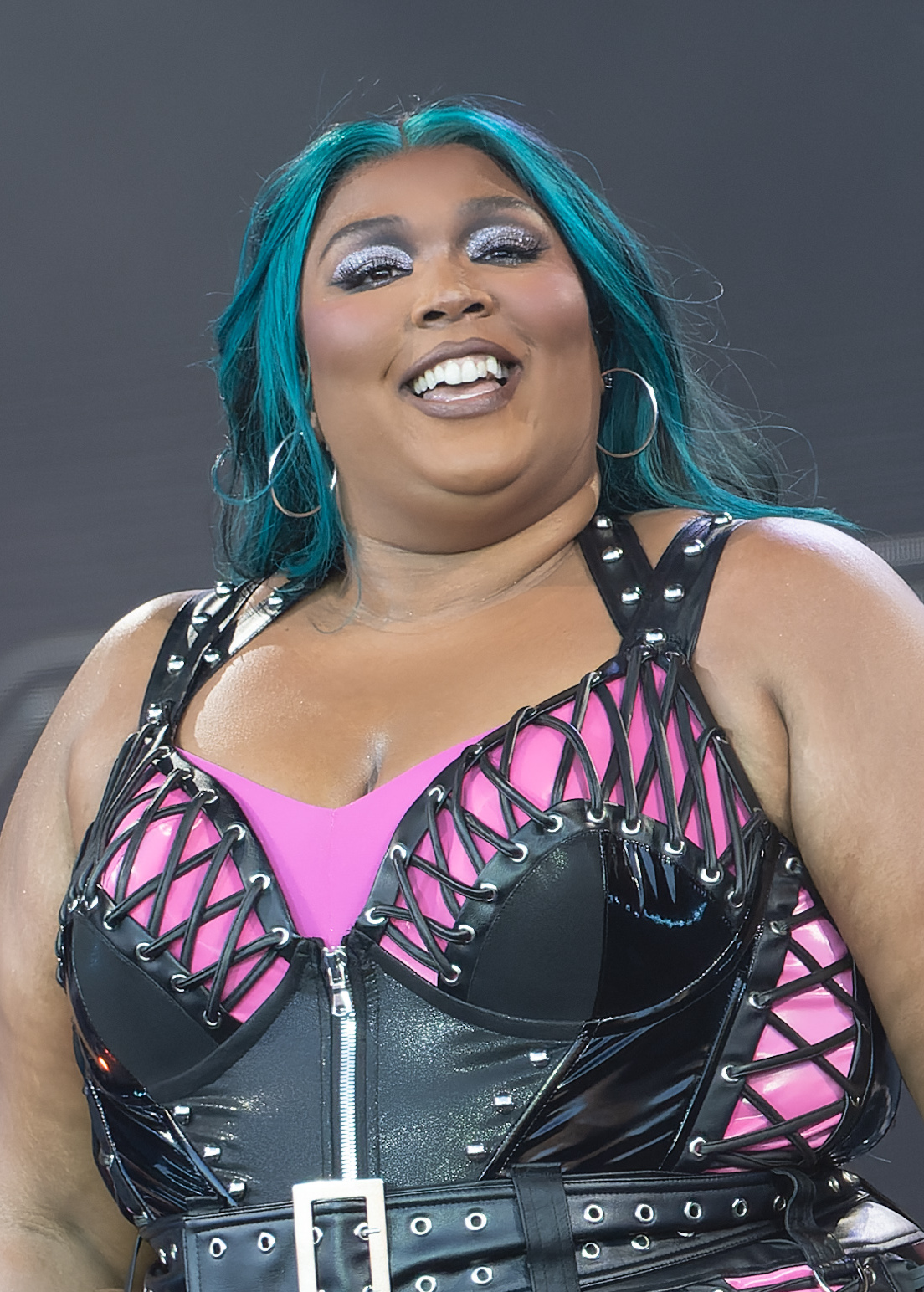
SZA co-wrote one SOS track with Lizzo and featured on two of her songs.

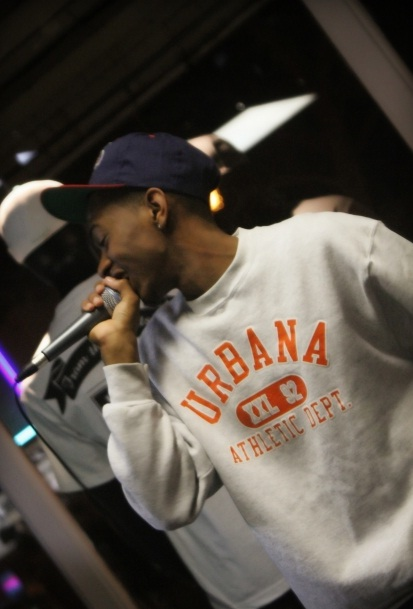
Brandun DeShay, one of SZA's earliest collaborators, co-wrote three songs from See.SZA.Run.

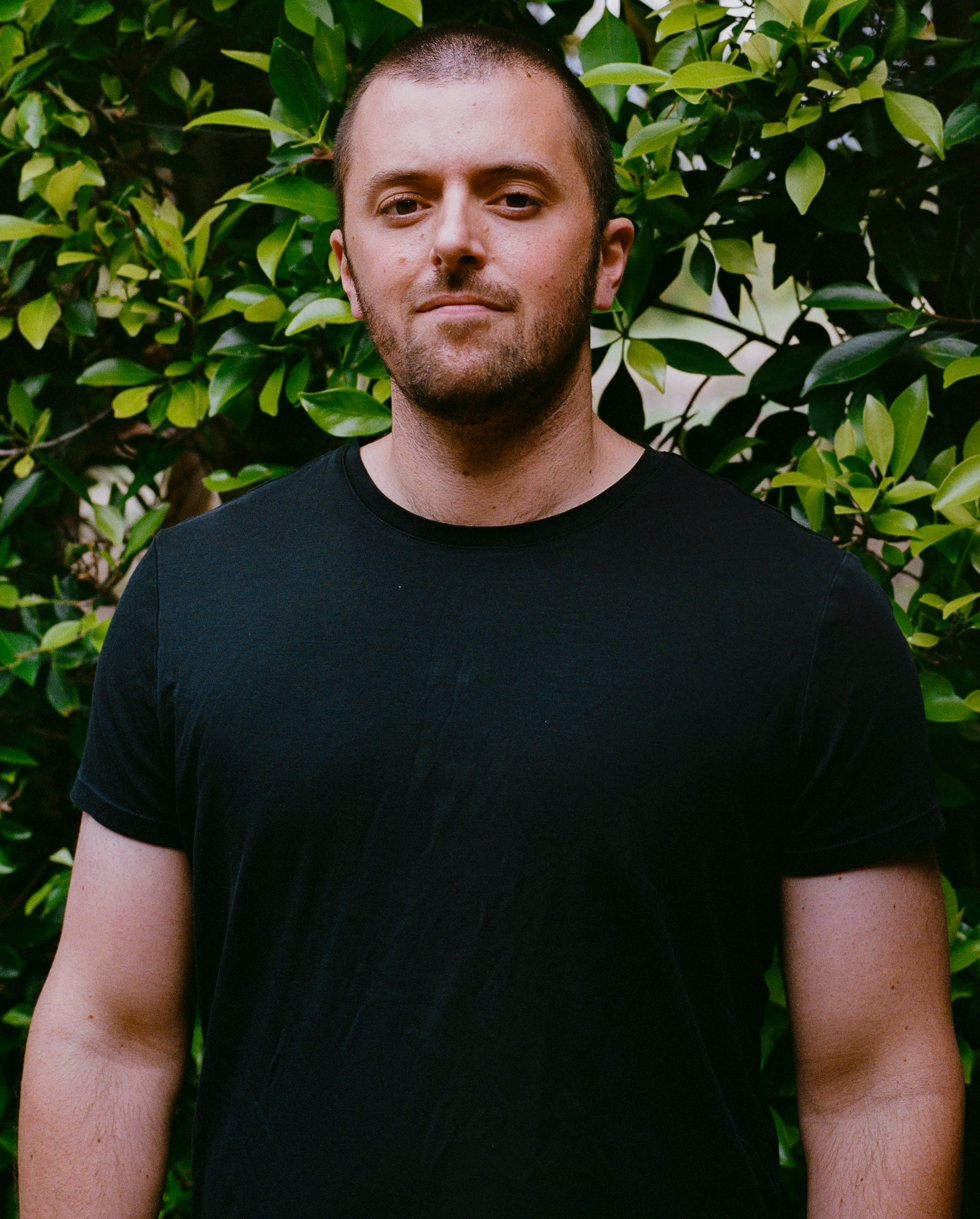
Producer Rob Bisel co-wrote 17 of the 23 songs on the standard edition of SOS.

List of songs, with featured performers, credited writers, associated release, and release year
Song	Performer(s)	Credited writer(s)	Album, EP, mixtape, or single(s)	Year	Ref.
"2AM"	SZA	Solána Rowe; Cody Fayne; Carter Lang; Jahron Anthony Brathwaite; Noah Shebib; Aubrey Graham	Ctrl (deluxe)	2022	
"9"	Willow Smith; SZA	Willow Smith; Solána Rowe; Emanuel Asadurian	3	2014	
"20 Something"	SZA	Solána Rowe; Tyran Donaldson; Carter Lang	Ctrl	2017	
"30 for 30" †	SZA; Kendrick Lamar	Solána Rowe; Kendrick Duckworth; Robert DeBarge; Michael Uzowuru; Anthony Jermaine White; Greg Williams	Lana	2025	
"About a Gemini, Pt. 3"	ImaniCarolyn; SZA	Savannah Imani-Carolyn Rowe; Solána Rowe	Into the Blue Light	2022	
"Advil"	SZA	Solána Rowe; Brandun DeShay	See.SZA.Run	2012	
"Aftermath"	SZA	Solána Rowe; Grant Michaels	S	2013	
"All the Stars" †	Kendrick Lamar; SZA	Kendrick Duckworth; Mark Spears; Al Shuckburgh; Solána Rowe; Anthony Tiffith	Black Panther: The Album	2018	
"The Anonymous Ones" †	SZA (Note: "The Anonymous Ones" is sung by Amandla Stenberg in the film.)	Benj Pasek; Justin Paul; Amandla Stenberg	Dear Evan Hansen: Original Motion Picture Soundtrack	2021	
"Another Life"	SZA	Solána Rowe; Rob Bisel; Michael Uzowuru; Dylan Wiggins	Lana	2024	
"Anything"	SZA	Solána Rowe; Tyran Donaldson; Carter Lang; Peter Wilkins; Donna Summer; Giorgio Moroder; Pete Bellotte	Ctrl	2017	
"Awkward"	SZA	Solána Rowe; Michael Uzowuru; Cody Fayne; Kelsey Gonzalez; Rutherford Allison	Ctrl (deluxe)	2022	
"Babylon" †	SZA; Kendrick Lamar	Solána Rowe; Dacoury Natche; Kendrick Duckworth	Z	2014	
"Beautiful"	DJ Khaled; Future; SZA	Khaled Khaled; Kavi Lybarger; Bryan Simmons; Nayvadius Wilburn; Solána Rowe; Madelaine Paola	God Did	2022	
"Bed"	SZA	Solána Rowe; Anthony Brent	See.SZA.Run	2012	
"Big Boys"	SZA; Keke Palmer	Punkie Johnson; Vannessa Jackson; Streeter Seidell	None	2022	
"Blind"	SZA	Solána Rowe; Rob Bisel; Carter Lang; Margaux Alexis Rosalena Whitney; Will Miller	SOS	2022	
"BMF" †	SZA	Solána Rowe; Blake Slatkin; Carter Lang; Omer Fedi; Antônio Carlos Jobim; Vinicius de Moraes	Lana	2025	
"Boy in Red" †	Isaiah Rashad; SZA	Isaiah McClain; Solána Rowe; Julian Asuaje; Timothy Vance; Justus Yearous	It's Been Awful	2026	
"Broken Clocks" †	SZA	Solána Rowe; Cody Fayne; Thomas Paxton-Beesley; Adam Feeney; Ashton Simmonds	Ctrl	2018	
"Caretaker"	DRAM; SZA	Shelley Massenburg-Smith; Solána Rowe; Peter Wilkins	Gahdamn!	2015	
"Castles" †	SZA	Solána Rowe; Felix Snow	S	2013	
"Childs Play" †	SZA; Chance the Rapper	Solána Rowe; Marcel Everett; Dameon Garrett; Chancelor Bennett	Z	2014	
"Chill Baby"	SZA	Solána Rowe; Cade Blodgett; Calvin Dickinson; Julian Friedl; Miles McCollum; Jeremiah Raisen; Leonhard Sitz	Lana	2024	
"Coming Back"	James Blake; SZA	James Litherland; Brittany Hazzard (Note: Dominic Maker and SZA are also credited in the song's entry in the Songview Database of the American Society of Composers, Authors and Publishers (ASCAP) and Broadcast Music, Inc. (BMI).)	Friends That Break Your Heart	2021	
"Conceited"	SZA	Solána Rowe; Cody Fayne; Rob Bisel	SOS	2022	
"Consideration"	Rihanna; SZA	Robyn Fenty; Tyran Donaldson; Solána Rowe	Anti	2016	
"Country" †	SZA	Solána Rowe; Brandun DeShay	See.SZA.Run	2012	
"Crack Dreams"	SZA	Solána Rowe; Brandun DeShay	See.SZA.Run	2012	
"Crybaby"	SZA	Solána Rowe; Carter Lang; Cody Fayne; Michael Uzowuru; Hannah Wardell; Daniel Abraham Jr.; Declan Miers	Lana	2024	
"Diamond Boy (DTM)"	SZA	Solána Rowe; Tyran Donaldson; Carter Lang; Declan Miers; Jared Solomon; Cody Fayne; Michael Uzowuru	Lana	2024	
"Divinity" †	SZA; Jill Scott	Unknown	Non-album single	2014	
"DJ's Chord Organ"	Mac Miller; SZA	Malcolm McCormick; Solána Rowe; Stephen Bruner	Balloonerism	2025	
"Doves in the Wind"	SZA; Kendrick Lamar	Solána Rowe; Cameron Osteen; Kendrick Duckworth; Reggie Noble; John Bowman; Dana Stinson; Trevor Smith; James Yancey	Ctrl	2017	
"Down 4 Whatever"	Kingdom; SZA	Unknown	Tears in the Club	2017	
"Drew Barrymore" †	SZA	Solána Rowe; Carter Lang; Tyran Donaldson; Macie Stewart; Terrence Henderson	Ctrl	2017	
"Drive"	SZA	Solána Rowe; Devin Abrams; Cody Fayne; William Lemos; Dallas Tamaira	Lana	2024	
"Easy Bake"	Jay Rock; Kendrick Lamar; SZA	Johnny McKinzie; Kendrick Duckworth; Solána Rowe; Chris Calor; Tyran Donaldson; Cody Fayne; Derrick Hutchins, Jr.; Isaiah Libeau	90059	2015	
"Euphraxia"	SZA	Dot	See.SZA.Run	2012	
"F2F"	SZA (Note: "F2F" contains additional vocals by Lizzo.)	Solána Rowe; Rob Bisel; Carter Lang; Melissa Jefferson	SOS	2022	
"Far"	SZA	Solána Rowe; Carter Lang; Rob Bisel; Tyran Donaldson; Carlos Muñoz; Eliot Dubock	SOS	2022	
"Flower in a Hurricane" †	Justice; Tame Impala; SZA; King Gizzard & the Lizard Wizard	Stu Mackenzie; Joey Walker; Ambrose Kenny-Smith; Cook Craig; Michael Cavanagh; Lucas Harwood; Gaspard Augé; Xavier de Rosnay; Kevin Parker; Sarah Aarons; Solána Rowe	Grand Theft Auto VI: The Album	2026	
"For Sale? (Interlude)" #	Kendrick Lamar	Kendrick Duckworth; Taz Arnold	To Pimp a Butterfly	2015	
"Forgiveless"	SZA; Ol' Dirty Bastard (Note: Ol' Dirty Bastard's feature is posthumous.)	Solána Rowe; Rodney Jerkins; Russell Tyrone Jones; Guy Sigsworth; Björk Guðmundsdóttir	SOS	2022	
"Freaky Girls"	Megan Thee Stallion; SZA	Megan Pete; Solána Rowe; Jordan Houston; George Clinton; William Collins; Gary Cooper; Eugene Hanes; Loren Hill; Marc Valentine	Good News	2020	
"Fue Mejor" †	Kali Uchis; SZA	Kali Uchis; Jahaan Sweet; Ray Nelson; Solána Rowe; Elena Rose	Sin Miedo (del Amor y Otros Demonios) (deluxe)	2021	
"Garden (Say It like Dat)" †	SZA	Solána Rowe; Daniel Tannenbaum; Craig Balmoris	Ctrl	2018	
"Get Behind Me (Interlude)"	SZA	Solána Rowe; Johnny May; Michael Uzowuru; Paul Andrew Williams	Lana	2024	
"Ghost in the Machine"	SZA; Phoebe Bridgers	Solána Rowe; Rob Bisel; Carter Lang; Matt Cohn; Marshall Vore; Phoebe Bridgers	SOS	2022	
"Girl, Get Up" †	Doechii; SZA	Jaylah Hickmon; Solána Rowe; Jahlil Gunter; Darius Scott; Charles Hugo; Gene Thornton; Terrence Thornton; Bryan Williams; Pharrell Williams	Non-album single	2025	
"Gloria"	Kendrick Lamar; SZA	Solána Rowe; Kendrick Duckworth; Atia Boggs; Jorge Castañeda; Dominik Patrzek; Mark Spears; Jack Antonoff	GNX	2024	
"Go Gina"	SZA	Solána Rowe; Tyran Donaldson; Carter Lang; Adam Feeney	Ctrl	2017	
"Gods Reign"	Ab-Soul; SZA	Herbert Stevens IV; Solána Rowe; Corin Roddick	These Days...	2014	
"Gone Girl"	SZA	Solána Rowe; Emile Haynie; Jeff Bhasker; Cody Fayne; Carter Lang; Rob Bisel	SOS	2022	
"Good Days" †	SZA (Note: "Good Days" contains additional vocals by Jacob Collier.)	Solána Rowe; Carter Lang; Christopher Ruelas; Carlos Muñoz; Jacob Collier	SOS	2020	
"Green Mile"	SZA	Solána Rowe; Emile Haynie	Z	2014	
"Happy Birthday"	Childish Major; SZA; Isaiah Rashad	Markus Randle; Solána Rowe; Isaiah McClain	Woosah	2017	
"Heavenly Father" #	Isaiah Rashad	Isaiah McClain; Desmond Sanders	Cilvia Demo	2014	
"HiiiJack"	SZA	Solána Rowe; Chazwick Bundick	Z	2014	
"His & Her Fiend"	Schoolboy Q; SZA	Quincy Hanley; Solána Rowe; Lance Howard	Oxymoron (deluxe)	2014	
"Hit Different" †	SZA; Ty Dolla Sign	Solána Rowe; Anthony Clemons, Jr.; Rob Bisel; Pharrell Williams; Tyrone Griffin; Chad Hugo; Jazzaé De Waal	Non-album single	2020	
"Homemade Dynamite" (remix) †	Lorde; Khalid; Post Malone; SZA	Ella Yelich-O'Connor; Khalid Robinson; Austin Post; Solána Rowe; Louis Bell; Jakob Jerlström; Tove Nilsson; Ludvig Söderberg	Melodrama	2017	
"I Do"	Cardi B; SZA	Belcalis Almanzar; Nija Charles; Shane Lindstrom	Invasion of Privacy	2018	
"I Hate U" †	SZA	Solána Rowe; Rob Bisel; Carter Lang; Cody Fayne; Dylan Patrice	SOS	2021	
"Ice.Moon" †	SZA	Solána Rowe; Felix Snow; Patrick Lukens	S	2013	
"IRL"	Lizzo; SZA	Melissa Jefferson; Solána Rowe; Sean Chavis; Kevin Reese McIver Jr.; Casey McMillian; Quentin Shemwell; Andrew Wansel	My Face Hurts from Smiling	2025	
"Is It Cool?"	Steve Lacy; SZA	Steve Lacy; Solána Rowe; Matthew Castellanos; Brittany Fousheé	Oh Yeah?	2026	
"Jodie"	SZA	Solána Rowe; Tyler Okonma	Ctrl (deluxe)	2022	
"Joni"	SZA; Don Toliver	Solána Rowe; Caleb Toliver; Rob Bisel; Steven Paul Smith	Lana (extended)	2025	
"Julia" †	SZA	Solána Rowe; Felix Snow (Note: Felix Snow is credited in the song's entry in the Songview Database as William Van Der Heyden.)	Z	2013	
"Just for Me" †	Saint Jhn; SZA	Carlos St. John Phillips; Solána Rowe; Levi Malundama; Patrick Morrissey; Ryn Weaver	Space Jam: A New Legacy (Original Motion Picture Soundtrack)	2021	
"Just Us" †	DJ Khaled; SZA	Khaled Khaled; Solána Rowe; Denisia Andrews; André Benjamin; Brittany Coney; Antwan Patton; David Sheats	Father of Asahd	2019	
"Kill Bill" †	SZA	Solána Rowe; Rob Bisel; Carter Lang	SOS	2023	
"Kill Bill" (remix) †	SZA; Doja Cat	Solána Rowe; Rob Bisel; Carter Lang; Amala Zandile Dlamini	Non-album single	2023	
"Kismet"	SZA	Solána Rowe; Jeremy Rose; Unknown co-writer	S	2013	
"Kiss Me More" †	Doja Cat; SZA	Amala Zandile Dlamini; David Sprecher; Rogét Chahayed; Gerard Powell II; Carter Lang; Lukasz Gottwald; Solána Rowe; Terence Shaddick; Stephen Kipner	Planet Her	2021	
"Kitchen"	SZA	Solána Rowe; Cody Fayne; Ernest Isley; Marvin Isley; O'Kelly Isley Jr.; Ronald Isley; Rudolph Isley; Christopher Jasper	Lana	2024	
"Lies" †	Felix Snow; SZA	Solána Rowe; Felix Snow; Unknown co-writer	Non-album single	2016	
"Lonely Soul / The Law (Prelude)"	Ab-Soul; Punch; SZA	Herbert Stevens IV; Solána Rowe; Stephen Bruner	Do What Thou Wilt.	2016	
"Love Galore" †	SZA; Travis Scott	Solána Rowe; Cody Fayne; Carter Lang; Jacques Webster; Terrence Henderson	Ctrl	2017	
"Love Galore" (Alt version)	SZA	Solána Rowe; Cody Fayne; Carter Lang; Terrence Henderson	Ctrl (deluxe)	2022	
"Love Language"	SZA	Solána Rowe; Cody Fayne; Carter Lang; Jakob Rabitsch; Anthony Clemons, Jr.; Rob Bisel; Pharrell Williams; Tyrone Griffin; Chad Hugo; Jazzaé De Waal	SOS	2022	
"Love Me 4 Me"	SZA	Solána Rowe; Rob Bisel; Carter Lang; Nick Lee	Lana	2024	
"Low"	SZA (Note: "Low" contains additional vocals by Travis Scott.)	Solána Rowe; Rob Bisel; Alessandro Buccellati; Joseph Pincus; Jocelyn A. Donald	SOS	2022	
"Luther" †	Kendrick Lamar; SZA	Solána Rowe; Kendrick Duckworth; Ruchaun Akers; Jack Antonoff; Roshwita Larisha Bacha; Matthew Bernard; Atia Boggs; Sam Dew; Marvin Gaye; Mark Spears; Kamasi Washington	GNX	2024	
"Miles"	SZA	Solána Rowe; Tyran Donaldson	Ctrl (deluxe)	2022	
"Moodring" †	SZA	Solána Rowe	Love the Free II	2014	
"Morning View"	Towkio; SZA	Preston Oshita; Solána Rowe; Carter Lang; Peder Losnegård	WWW	2018	
"My Turn"	SZA	Solána Rowe; Rob Bisel; Cody Fayne; Dylan Neustadter	Lana	2024	
"The Need to Know"	Wale; SZA	Olubowale Akintimehin; Julian Gramma; Carvin Haggins; Bobby Hebb; Taalib Johnson	The Album About Nothing	2015	
"Needle" #	Nicki Minaj; Drake	Onika Maraj; Aubrey Graham; Johann Deterville; Rahiem Hurlock; Matthew Samuels; Noah Shebib	Pink Friday 2	2023	
"Neva Change"	Schoolboy Q; SZA	Quincy Hanley; Dacoury Natche; Larrance Dopson; Solána Rowe	Blank Face LP	2016	
"Never Lose Me"	Flo Milli; SZA; Cardi B	Tamia Carter; Solána Rowe; Belcalis Almanzar; Dion Hayes; Gerald Henry; Gerreaux Katana; Marcellus Rayvon Register; Hitoshi Kirigaya	Fine Ho, Stay	2024	
"No Love" †	Summer Walker; SZA	Summer Walker; Solána Rowe; Sean Garrett; Charles Ocansey; Sony Ramos	Still Over It	2022	
"No Love" (extended) †	Summer Walker; SZA; Cardi B	Summer Walker; Solána Rowe; Belcalis Almanzar; Sean Garrett; Charles Hinshaw, Jr.; Charles McAllister; Charles Ocansey; Sony Ramos	Still Over It	2022	
"No More Hiding"	SZA	Solána Rowe; Serge Andre Georges Bulot; Michael Uzowuru	Lana	2024	
"No Szns" †	Jean Dawson; SZA	David Sanders; Solána Rowe; Zach Fogarty; Jesse Schuster; Elliott Kozel; Austin Corona; Wyatt Bernard	Non-album single	2023	
"Nobody Gets Me" †	SZA	Solána Rowe; Benjamin Levin; Carter Lang; Rob Bisel	SOS	2023	
"Normal Girl"	SZA	Solána Rowe; Carter Lang; Tyran Donaldson; Terrence Henderson	Ctrl	2017	
"Notice Me"	SZA	Solána Rowe; Teo Halm; Michael Uzowuru; Rob Bisel; Carter Lang; Cody Fayne	SOS	2022	
"The Odyssey"	SZA	Solána Rowe; Brandun DeShay	S	2013	
"Ok Alright" #	Travis Scott; Schoolboy Q	Jacques Webster; Leland Wayne; Sonny Uwaezuoke; Quincy Hanley; Solána Rowe	Rodeo	2015	
"Omega"	SZA	Solána Rowe; Emile Haynie	Z	2014	
"Once Upon a High"	SZA	Solána Rowe; Hasan Moore	See.SZA.Run	2012	
"Open Arms"	SZA; Travis Scott	Solána Rowe; Rob Bisel; Michael Uzowuru; Teo Halm; Douglas Ford; Jacques Webster	SOS	2022	
"Open Arms (Just SZA)"	SZA	Solána Rowe; Rob Bisel; Michael Uzowuru; Teo Halm; Douglas Ford	SOS (download-only edition); Lana (extended edition)	2023; 2025	
"The Other Side" †	SZA; Justin Timberlake	Justin Timberlake; Ludwig Göransson; Max Martin; Sarah Aarons; Solána Rowe	Trolls World Tour: Original Motion Picture Soundtrack	2020	
"Percolator"	SZA	Solána Rowe; Craig Brockman; Tyran Donaldson; Cody Fayne; Charlene Keys; Nisan Stewart	Ctrl (deluxe)	2022	
"Persuasive" (remix) †	Doechii; SZA	Jaylah Hickmon; Solána Rowe; Kalon Berry; Austin Brown; Leoren Davis; Ivan Rosenberg; Zachary Whittlesey	She / Her / Black Bitch	2022	
"Power Is Power" †	SZA; The Weeknd; Travis Scott	Abel Tesfaye; Solána Rowe; Jason Quenneville; Ahmad Balshe; Jacques Webster; Eric Frederic; Sam Harris; Myles Martin; Victor Dimotsis; Zach Cooper	For the Throne: Music Inspired by the HBO Series Game of Thrones	2019	
"Pray"	SZA	Solána Rowe; Felix Snow	S	2013	
"Pretty Little Birds"	SZA; Isaiah Rashad	Solána Rowe; Tyran Donaldson; Carter Lang; Josef Leimberg; Isaiah McClain	Ctrl	2017	
"Prom"	SZA	Solána Rowe; Carter Lang; Tyran Donaldson	Ctrl	2017	
"PSA"	SZA	Solána Rowe; Rob Bisel; Carter Lang; Will Miller	SOS (download-only edition); Lana (extended edition)	2023; 2025	
"PT Cruiser" †	Moruf; SZA	Moruf Adewunmi; Solána Rowe; Nathan Bajar; Jesse Boykins III	Moolodic: Hotep Luxury	2025	
"Quicksand"	SZA	Solána Rowe; Dacoury Natche; Ryan DeGrandy	Insecure (Music from the HBO Original Series)	2017	
"Real Thing"	ASAP Ferg; SZA	Unknown	Ferg Forever	2014	
"Redemption"	Jay Rock; SZA	Johnny McKinzie; Solána Rowe; Mark Spears; Terrace Martin; Timmy Gatling; Gene Griffin; Aaron Hall; Edward Riley	Redemption	2018	
"Rich Baby Daddy" †	Drake; Sexyy Red; SZA	Aubrey Graham; Janae Wherry; Solána Rowe; Shivam Barot; Diamanté Anthony Blackmon; Yuval Chain; Mac Felländer-Tsai; Douglas Ford; Johannes Klahr; Benjamin Saint Fort; Tom Schaeferdiek; Isabella Summers; Florence Welch; Richard Zastenker	For All the Dogs	2023	
"Ronnie Drake" †	Isaiah Rashad; SZA	Isaiah McClain; Tyran Donaldson; Solána Rowe	Cilvia Demo	2014	
"Saturn" †	SZA	Solána Rowe; Carter Lang; Rob Bisel; Jared Solomon; Scott Zhang; Cian Ducrot	Lana	2024	
"Save the Day" †	SZA	Solána Rowe; Rob Bisel; Ben Lovett	Hoppers (Original Motion Picture Soundtrack)	2026	
"Score"	Isaiah Rashad; SZA; 6lack	Isaiah McClain; Solána Rowe; Kenneth Blume III; Ricardo Valentine	The House Is Burning	2021	
"Scorsese Baby Daddy"	SZA	Solána Rowe; Tyler Johnson; Michael Uzowuru	Lana	2024	
"See You in My Dreams"	Victoria Monét; SZA	Victoria Monét; Solána Rowe; Darhyl Camper, Jr.; Jeff Gitelman; Branden Rowell; Suzanne Vega	Frequency of Love	2026	
"Seek & Destroy"	SZA	Solána Rowe; Rob Bisel; Cody Fayne; Tyran Donaldson; Carter Lang	SOS	2022	
"Shattered Ring"	SZA	Solána Rowe; Emile Haynie	Z	2014	
"Shirt" †	SZA	Solána Rowe; Rodney Jerkins; Rob Gueringer	SOS	2022	
"Slime You Out" †	Drake; SZA	Aubrey Graham; Solána Rowe; Noel Cadastre; Grant Lapointe; Christopher Powell; Benjamin Saint Fort; Noah Shebib; Dalton Tennant	For All the Dogs	2023	
"Smoking on My Ex Pack"	SZA	Solána Rowe; Jahlil Gunter; Skip Scarborough; Raina Taylor	SOS	2022	
"Snooze" †	SZA	Solána Rowe; Kenny Edmonds; Khris Riddick-Tynes; Leon Thomas III; Blair Ferguson	SOS	2023	
"Snooze" (acoustic) †	SZA; Justin Bieber	Solána Rowe; Justin Bieber; Kenny Edmonds; Khris Riddick-Tynes; Leon Thomas III; Blair Ferguson	Non-album single	2023	
"Sobriety" †	SZA	Solána Rowe; Stephen Bruner; Chris Calor; Cody Fayne; Josef Leimberg; Mark Spears	Non-album single	2014	
"SOS"	SZA	Solána Rowe; Jahlil Gunter; Rob Bisel; Gabriel Samuel Hardeman	SOS	2022	
"Special"	SZA	Solána Rowe; Benjamin Levin; Shellback; Blake Slatkin; Omer Fedi; Rob Bisel	SOS	2022	
"Special" (remix) †	Lizzo; SZA	Melissa Jefferson; Solána Rowe; Daoud Anthony; Ian Kirkpatrick; Max Martin; Theron Thomas; Andrew Wansel	Special	2023	
"Staring at the Sun"	Post Malone; SZA	Austin Post; Louis Bell; Billy Walsh; Seth Nyquist; Solána Rowe; Adam Feeney; Matt Tavares	Hollywood's Bleeding	2019	
"Stuck in the Mud"	Isaiah Rashad; SZA	Isaiah McClain; Desmond Sanders; Russell Scott-Wood; Solána Rowe	The Sun's Tirade	2016	
"Supermodel"	SZA	Solána Rowe; Tyran Donaldson; Terrence Henderson; Carter Lang; Greg Landfair, Jr.	Ctrl	2017	
"Sweet November"	SZA	Solána Rowe; Hamilton Bohannon; Marvin Gaye	Z	2014	
"Take Me Dancing"	Doja Cat; SZA	Amala Zandile Dlamini; Solána Rowe; Jack Antonoff; Gavin Bennett; Joseph Caleb; Kurtis McKenzie; Michael Orabiyi; Ari Starace	Vie	2025	
"Take You Down"	SZA	Solána Rowe; Cody Fayne; Dexter Suhn	Lana (extended)	2025	
"Teen Spirit" †	SZA	Solána Rowe; Ebony Oshunrinde	Non-album single	2013	
"Teen Spirit" (remix) †	SZA; 50 Cent	Solána Rowe; Ebony Oshunrinde; Curtis Jackson	Non-album single	2013	
"Telekinesis"	Travis Scott; SZA; Future	Jacques Webster; Solána Rowe; Nayvadius Wilburn; Victory Boyd; Jahmal Gwin; Nima Jahanbin; Paimon Jahanbin; Edgar Panford; Hudson Mohawke; Jahaan Sweet; Kanye West	Utopia	2023	
"Terror.Dome"	SZA	Solána Rowe; Waren Vaughn	S	2013	
"Time Travel Undone" †	SZA	Solána Rowe; Hasan Moore	See.SZA.Run	2012	
"Tomorrow"	Kris Kasanova; SZA	Unknown	24K	2013	
"Too Late"	SZA	Solána Rowe; Rob Bisel; Carter Lang; Cody Fayne; Sammy Witte; Sven Gamsky	SOS	2022	
"Tread Carefully"	SZA	Solána Rowe; Tyran Donaldson; Cody Fayne	Ctrl (deluxe)	2022	
"TwoAM" †	SZA	Solána Rowe; Cody Fayne; Carter Lang; Jahron Anthony Brathwaite; Noah Shebib; Aubrey Graham	Non-album single	2016	
"U" #	Kendrick Lamar	Kendrick Duckworth; Columbus Smith; Fredrik Halldin	To Pimp a Butterfly	2015	
"Untitled 04 | 08.14.2014"	Kendrick Lamar; SZA	Kendrick Duckworth; Mark Spears; Stephen Bruner	Untitled Unmastered	2016	
"Ur"	SZA	Solána Rowe; Unknown co-writer	Z	2014	
"Used"	SZA; Don Toliver	Solána Rowe; Dacoury Natche; John Hill; Ely Rise; Danny McKinnon; John Key; Caleb Toliver	SOS	2022	
"Warm Winds" †	SZA; Isaiah Rashad	Tyran Donaldson; Isaiah McClain; Chris Calor	Z	2014	
"Wavy (Interlude)"	SZA; James Fauntleroy	Solána Rowe; Lukasz Plas; Cody Fayne; James Fauntleroy	Ctrl	2017	
"The Weekend" †	SZA	Solána Rowe; Cody Fayne; Justin Timberlake; Timothy Mosley; Floyd Hills	Ctrl	2017	
"The Weekend" (Funk Wav remix) †	SZA; Calvin Harris	Solána Rowe; Cody Fayne; Adam Wiles; Justin Timberlake; Timothy Mosley; Floyd Hills	Non-album single	2017	
"What Do I Do"	SZA	Solána Rowe; Cody Fayne; Magnus August Høiberg; Carter Lang; Benjamin Levin	Lana	2024	
"What Is Love"	Kingdom; SZA	Rush Davis	Tears in the Club	2017	
"What Lovers Do" †	Maroon 5; SZA	Brittany Hazzard; Adam Levine; Jason Evigan; Solána Rowe; Benjamin Diehl; Oladayo Olatunji	Red Pill Blues	2017	
"West Savannah"	Isaiah Rashad; SZA	Isaiah McClain; Tyran Donaldson; Solána Rowe	Cilvia Demo	2014	
"Wings"	SZA	Solána Rowe; Patrick Lukens	S	2013	

== Songs without an official release ==
List of songs without an official release, with confirmed performers and a brief description
Song	Performer(s)	Description
"Am I a Bitch?"	SZA	Teased via SZA's Instagram account on November 7, 2026; Samples the song "Hush" by British singer-songwriter Natanya
"Back Together"	SZA	One of the many songs that was part of a 2018 leak on Spotify of unreleased SZA and Kendrick Lamar music; Released as part of an EP Comethru; Quickly removed from digital streaming platforms (DSPs)
"Band Aids in a Box"	SZA	Registered at the Songview Database of the American Society of Composers, Authors and Publishers (ASCAP) and Broadcast Music, Inc. (BMI); Written by SZA and Felix Snow
"Brace Urself"	SZA	First teased in December 2018; Music video teased in May 2019; Debuted live during an Australian tour in July 2019
"Breaking Even"	SZA	A scrapped outtake from Ctrl
"Burgers"	SZA	Song that will presumably appear on SZA's third studio album; Teased in a GQ cover story published in November 2025
"Calling My Phone"	Lil Tjay; 6lack; SZA	A scrapped version of "Calling My Phone" (2021) by Lil Tjay featuring 6lack, which featured a SZA verse; Verse scrapped because SZA felt the song would already be good without her; Verse leaked in June 2023
"Comethru"	SZA	One of the many songs that was part of a 2018 leak on Spotify of unreleased SZA and Kendrick Lamar music; Released as part of an EP Comethru; Quickly removed from DSPs
"Die for You" (remix)	The Weeknd; SZA	A scrapped SZA remix of "Die for You" (2017) by the Weeknd; Premiered on the 18th episode of the Weeknd's Apple Music 1 radio show Memento Mori in October 2021; He and SZA have taken interest in re-recording her verse
"Domino"	Willow Smith; SZA	An unreleased R&B ballad by Willow Smith and SZA; Debuted live in 2014, during a concert at a Rough Trade record store in Brooklyn
"Guard Down"	SZA	An SOS outtake, teased online prior to the album's release
"Heroin"	SZA	One of the many songs that was part of a 2018 leak on Spotify of unreleased SZA and Kendrick Lamar music; Released as part of an EP Comethru; Quickly removed from DSPs
"Iris"	SZA	Cover of "Iris" (1998) by the Goo Goo Dolls; Posted via SZA's Instagram account
"Inside Man"	SZA	Snippet version included at the outro for the SoundCloud and DSP version of "2AM"
"Lack of Better Words"	SZA; Kendrick Lamar	One of the many songs that was part of a 2018 leak on Spotify of unreleased SZA and Kendrick Lamar music; Released as part of an EP Comethru; Quickly removed from DSPs
"Let You Know"	SZA	Teased on August 16, 2025, via an alternate Instagram account; R&B track with an airy sound; Expected to appear on her upcoming third studio album
"Lose Yourself"	SZA	A soft, acoustic cover of "Lose Yourself" (2002) by Eminem; Posted via SZA's Instagram account
"Loved Ones"	SZA; Kendrick Lamar	One of the many songs that was part of a 2018 leak on Spotify of unreleased SZA and Kendrick Lamar music; Released as part of an EP Comethru; Quickly removed from DSPs
"Ms. Never Miss"	SZA	Produced by Jay Versace; Features aggressive lyrics like "drove by your funeral just to piss in the ditch" and " I might really be that bitch, might really got that niche"; Contains references to the Toy Story cartoon franchise ("to infinity and beyond, I gotta buzz off the prospect") and the Netflix documentary Tiger King ("selling kitty like Carole"); Teased on January 6, 2025, ahead of the extended version of Lana; Teaser features SZA beside a campfire with a pink flame; Not released as a part of Lana's extended version because SZA was "[just] sharing" random music
"Nightbird"	SZA	Uploaded to SoundCloud by an anonymous account, later revealed to be SZA's, alongside "I Hate U" and "Joni"; Unofficially released because SZA was told by her astrologist to do so
"Passenger Princess"	SZA	Song that will presumably appear on SZA's third studio album; Teased in a GQ cover story published in November 2025
"Passport"	SZA	One of the many songs that was part of a 2018 leak on Spotify of unreleased SZA and Kendrick Lamar music; Released as part of an EP Comethru; Quickly removed from DSPs
"Seasonal Depression"	SZA	Teased via Twitter sometime in 2022; Described as "a song about feelings"
"Tender"	SZA	Previewed at the outro of the "Julia" music video (2014)
"Writer's Block – Interlude"	SZA	One of the many songs that was part of a 2018 leak on Spotify of unreleased SZA and Kendrick Lamar music; Released as part of an EP Comethru; Quickly removed from DSPs
"Yearner"	SZA	Song that will presumably appear on SZA's third studio album; Teased in a GQ cover story published in November 2025
