= SZA discography =

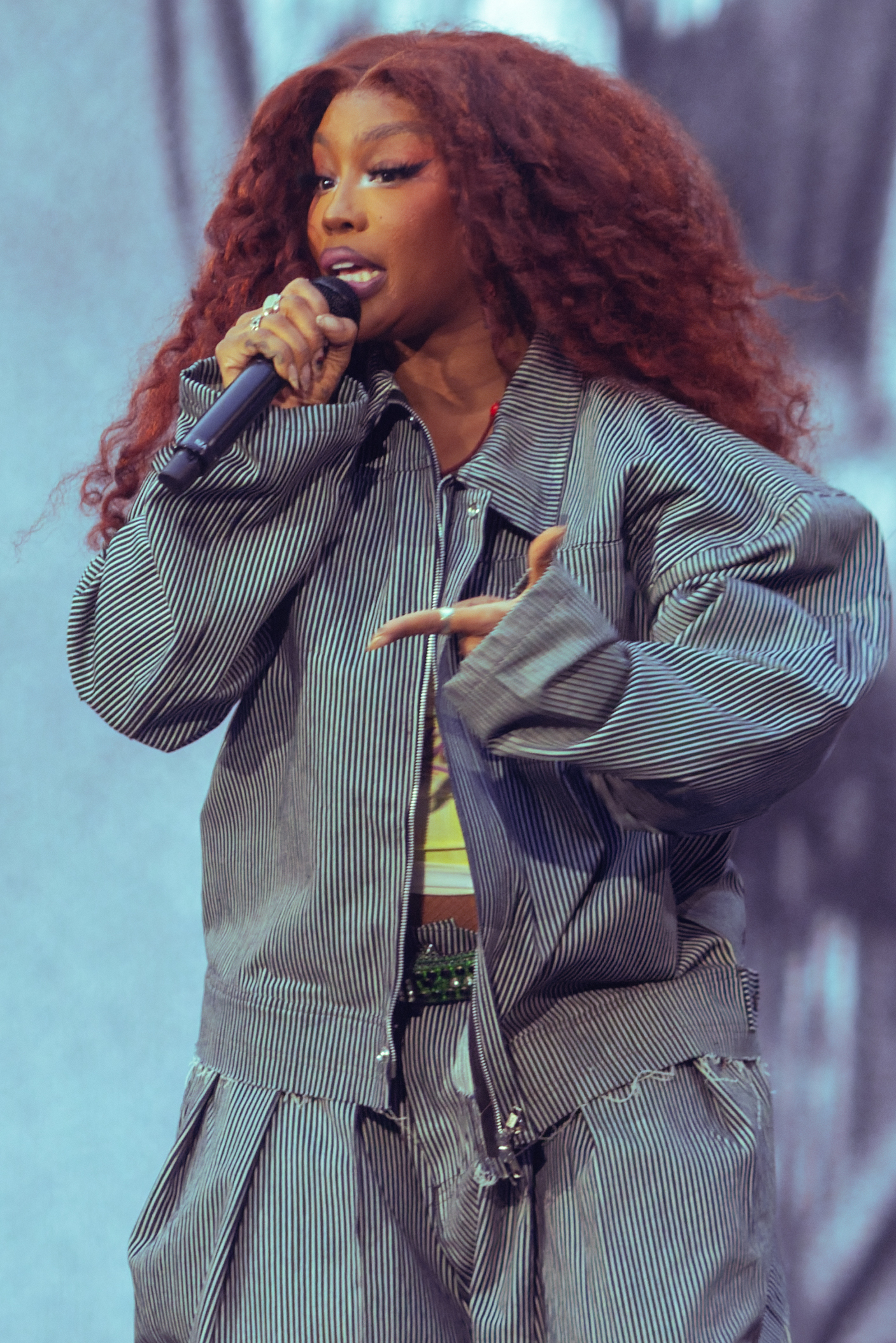
- SZA in 2025
- Studio albums: 2
- EPs: 3
- Live albums: 1
- Compilation albums: 1
- Singles: 54
- Promotional singles: 4
- Music videos: 38
- Reissues: 1

American singer-songwriter SZA has released two studio albums, one reissue album, three extended plays (EPs), one live album, one compilation album, and fifty-four singles (including thirteen as a featured artist). SZA debuted with her self-released EP See.SZA.Run in 2012, followed by the 2013 EP S, gaining the attention of the independent record label Top Dawg Entertainment. She signed to Top Dawg as the label's first woman artist in 2013 and released her third EP, Z, a year later. After Z, she began work on her debut studio album, Ctrl (2017), which debuted at number three on the US Billboard 200, peaked at number two on Top R&B/Hip-Hop Albums, and has charted for more than five subsequent years. The album, alongside its Billboard Hot 100 top-40 singles "Love Galore" and "The Weekend", earned her three of her first five Grammy nominations, in 2018. All singles from Ctrl have been certified platinum or higher by the Recording Industry Association of America.

From 2017 to 2022, as SZA prepared for her second studio album's release, she appeared on film soundtracks and collaborated with several artists. Three collaborations were international top-10 songs: "What Lovers Do" by Maroon 5 in 2017, "All the Stars" with Kendrick Lamar from the Black Panther soundtrack in 2018, and "Kiss Me More" by Doja Cat in 2021. Furthermore, a deluxe edition of Ctrl was released in June 2022 to celebrate the album's five-year anniversary. In December 2022, SZA's second studio album SOS was released, and it broke several records in R&B/hip-hop and overall charts. In the US, it opened with the biggest streaming week ever for an R&B album, spent 10 weeks atop the Billboard 200, and ended 2023 as the country's third-biggest album with 3.172 million album-equivalent units sold. Its multi-platinum fifth single, "Kill Bill", was the third best-selling song of 2023. The same year, Rolling Stone ranked SOS and Ctrl as two of the 500 greatest albums of all time.

In December 2024, SZA released the reissue of SOS, Lana. It spawned two top-10 songs. The first was the lead single "Saturn", released earlier in February, and the second was "30 for 30" with Lamar. Lana was rereleased in 2025 with new mixing and four bonus songs scrapped from the reissue, including the leaked collaboration "Joni" featuring Don Toliver. Regarding unreleased tracks, SZA has said that she loses her confidence in the quality of her music once they are leaked online.

== Albums ==
=== Studio albums ===
List of studio albums
| Title | Album details | Peak chart positions | | | | | | | | | | Sales | Certifications |
| Title | Album details | US | AUS | CAN | DEN | IRE | NLD | NZ | NOR | SWE | UK | Sales | Certifications |
|---|---|---|---|---|---|---|---|---|---|---|---|---|---|
| Ctrl | Released: June 9, 2017; Label: Top Dawg, RCA; Format: CD, LP, digital download, streaming | 3 | 13 | 11 | — | 27 | 58 | 11 | — | — | 45 | US: 337,908 (Note: In 2017 the album sold 127,000 pure copies In 2018, it sold 83,000 copies and 127,908 copies in 2023) | RIAA: 6× Platinum; ARIA: Platinum; BPI: Platinum; IFPI DEN: Platinum; MC: 2× Platinum; RMNZ: 5× Platinum |
| SOS | Released: December 9, 2022; Label: Top Dawg, RCA; Format: CD, LP, digital download, streaming | 1 | 1 | 1 | 1 | 2 | 1 | 1 | 1 | 4 | 2 | US: 262,500 (Note: In 2022 the album sold 8,500 pure copies In 2023, the album sold 199,000 copies In 2024, the album sold 55,000 copies); CAN: 4,000 (Note: In 2023 the album sold 4,000 pure copies) | RIAA: 8× Platinum; ARIA: 2× Platinum; BPI: 2× Platinum; GLF: Gold; IFPI DEN: Platinum; MC: 7× Platinum; NVPI: Platinum; RMNZ: 8× Platinum |
"—" denotes a title that did not chart, or was not released in that territory.

=== Reissues ===
List of reissues
| Title | Details | Peak chart positions |
| Title | Details | NOR |
|---|---|---|
| Lana | Released: December 20, 2024; Label: Top Dawg, RCA; Format: LP, CD, digital download, streaming | 4 |

=== Live albums ===
List of live albums
| Title | Details |
|---|---|
| Apple Music Live: SZA | Released: January 31, 2024; Label: Top Dawg, RCA; Format: Digital download, streaming |

=== Compilation albums ===
List of live albums
| Title | Details |
|---|---|
| SZA | Released: March 4, 2016; Format: Digital download, streaming |

== Extended plays ==
List of extended plays
| Title | EP details | Peak chart positions | | | | |
| Title | EP details | US | US R&B/HH | US R&B | UK | UK R&B |
|---|---|---|---|---|---|---|
| See.SZA.Run | Released: October 29, 2012; Label: Self-released; Format: Streaming | — | — | — | — | — |
| S | Released: April 10, 2013; Label: Self-released; Format: Streaming | — | — | — | — | — |
| Z | Released: April 8, 2014; Label: Top Dawg; Format: CD, LP, digital download, streaming | 39 | 9 | 5 | 197 | 32 |
"—" denotes a title that did not chart, or was not released in that territory.

== Singles ==
=== As lead artist ===
List of singles
| Title | Year | Peak chart positions | | | | | | | | | | Certifications | Album |
| Title | Year | US | US R&B /HH | AUS | CAN | IRE | NZ | NOR | SWE | UK | WW | Certifications | Album |
|---|---|---|---|---|---|---|---|---|---|---|---|---|---|
| "Time Travel Undone" | 2012 | — | — | — | — | — | — | — | — | — | — | | See.SZA.Run |
| "Country" | 2012 | — | — | — | — | — | — | — | — | — | — | | See.SZA.Run |
| "Ice.Moon" | 2013 | — | — | — | — | — | — | — | — | — | — | | S |
| "Aftermath" | 2013 | — | — | — | — | — | — | — | — | — | — | | S |
| "Teen Spirit" | 2013 | — | — | — | — | — | — | — | — | — | — | | Non-album single |
| "Julia" | 2013 | — | — | — | — | — | — | — | — | — | — | | Z |
| "Castles" | 2013 | — | — | — | — | — | — | — | — | — | — | | S |
| "Childs Play" (featuring Chance the Rapper) | 2014 | — | — | — | — | — | — | — | — | — | — | RIAA: Platinum; RMNZ: Gold | Z |
| "Babylon" (featuring Kendrick Lamar) | 2014 | — | — | — | — | — | — | — | — | — | — | | Z |
| "Warm Winds" (featuring Isaiah Rashad) | 2014 | — | — | — | — | — | — | — | — | — | — | | Z |
| "Moodring" | 2014 | — | — | — | — | — | — | — | — | — | — | | Love the Free II |
| "Divinity" (with Jill Scott) | 2014 | — | — | — | — | — | — | — | — | — | — | | Non-album singles |
| "Sobriety" | 2014 | — | — | — | — | — | — | — | — | — | — | | Non-album singles |
| "TwoAM" (Note: Charted as "2AM", with the number written in numerals instead of spelled out) | 2016 | — | 45 | — | — | — | — (Note: "2AM" did not enter the NZ Top 40 Singles Chart, but it peaked at number 15 on the NZ Hot Singles Chart.) | — | — | — | — | RIAA: Gold | Non-album singles |
| "Drew Barrymore" | 2017 | — | — | — | — | — | — | — | — | — | — | RIAA: 3× Platinum; BPI: Gold; MC: Platinum; RMNZ: Platinum | Ctrl |
| "Love Galore" (featuring Travis Scott) | 2017 | 32 | 12 | — | 84 | — | — | — | — | — | — | RIAA: 9× Platinum; BPI: Platinum; MC: 4× Platinum; RMNZ: 5× Platinum | Ctrl |
| "The Weekend" (solo or with Calvin Harris) | 2017 | 29 | 13 | 49 | 63 | 73 | — (Note: "The Weekend" did not enter the NZ Top 40 Singles Chart, but it peaked at number three on the NZ Heatseeker Singles Chart.) | — | — | 55 | — | RIAA: 7× Platinum; RIAA: Platinum (remix); ARIA: 2× Platinum; BPI: 2× Platinum; MC: 5× Platinum; RMNZ: 5× Platinum | Ctrl |
| "All the Stars" (with Kendrick Lamar) | 2018 | 7 | 5 | 2 | 7 | 3 | 2 | 6 | 7 | 5 | 6 | RIAA: 2× Platinum; ARIA: 13× Platinum; BPI: 4× Platinum; GLF: Platinum; MC: 6× Platinum; RMNZ: 9× Platinum | Black Panther: The Album |
| "Broken Clocks" | 2018 | 82 | 39 | — | — | — | — | — | — | — | — | RIAA: 8× Platinum; BPI: Platinum; MC: 2× Platinum; RMNZ: 3× Platinum | Ctrl |
| "Garden (Say It like Dat)" | 2018 | — | — | — | — | — | — | — | — | — | — | RIAA: 3× Platinum; BPI: Silver; MC: Platinum; RMNZ: 2× Platinum | Ctrl |
| "Power Is Power" (with the Weeknd and Travis Scott) | 2019 | 90 | 36 | 30 | 50 | 31 | — (Note: "Power Is Power" did not enter the NZ Top 40 Singles Chart, but it peaked at number three on the NZ Hot Singles Chart.) | 33 | 41 | 45 | — | RIAA: Gold | For the Throne: Music Inspired by the HBO Series Game of Thrones |
| "The Other Side" (with Justin Timberlake) | 2020 | 61 | 31 | 43 | 54 | 56 | — (Note: "The Other Side" did not enter the NZ Top 40 Singles Chart, but it peaked at number two on the NZ Hot Singles Chart.) | — | — (Note: "The Other Side" did not enter the Swedish Singellista Chart, but it peaked at number 10 on the Swedish Heatseeker Chart.) | 44 | — | RIAA: Platinum; BPI: Silver; RMNZ: Gold | Trolls World Tour: Original Motion Picture Soundtrack |
| "Hit Different" (featuring Ty Dolla Sign) | 2020 | 29 | 12 | 84 | 55 | — | — (Note: "Hit Different" did not enter the NZ Top 40 Singles Chart, but it peaked at number two on the NZ Hot Singles Chart.) | — | — | 55 | 36 | RIAA: 3× Platinum; BPI: Silver; RMNZ: Platinum | Non-album single |
| "Good Days" | 2020 | 9 | 3 | 7 | 12 | 8 | 3 | 15 | 26 | 13 | 7 | RIAA: Diamond; ARIA: 4× Platinum; BPI: 2× Platinum; GLF: Gold; MC: 7× Platinum; RMNZ: 6× Platinum | SOS |
| "Just for Me" (with Saint Jhn) | 2021 | — | — | — | — | — | — (Note: "Just for Me" did not enter the NZ Top 40 Singles Chart, but it peaked at number 23 on the NZ Hot Singles Chart.) | — | — | — | — | | Space Jam: A New Legacy (Original Motion Picture Soundtrack) |
| "The Anonymous Ones" | 2021 | — | — | — | — | — | — | — | — | — | — | | Dear Evan Hansen: Original Motion Picture Soundtrack |
| "Fue Mejor" (with Kali Uchis) | 2021 | — (Note: "Fue Mejor" did not enter the Billboard Hot 100, but it peaked at number 16 on the Bubbling Under Hot 100 chart.) | — | — | — | — | — (Note: "Fue Mejor" did not enter the NZ Top 40 Singles Chart, but it peaked at number seven on the NZ Hot Singles Chart.) | — | — | — | 187 | RIAA: Platinum | Sin Miedo (del Amor y Otros Demonios) (deluxe) |
| "I Hate U" | 2021 | 7 | 1 | 16 | 14 | 27 | 8 | — | — (Note: "I Hate U" did not enter the Swedish Singellista Chart, but it peaked at number one on the Swedish Heatseeker Chart.) | 38 | 11 | RIAA: 4× Platinum; ARIA: Platinum; BPI: Gold; MC: 2× Platinum; RMNZ: 2× Platinum | SOS |
| "No Love" (with Summer Walker) | 2022 | 13 | 5 | — | 37 | — | — (Note: "No Love" did not enter the NZ Top 40 Singles Chart, but it peaked at number five on the New Zealand Hot Singles chart.) | — | — | 24 | 17 | RIAA: 2× Platinum; ARIA: Gold; BPI: Silver; MC: Gold; RMNZ: Platinum | Still Over It |
| "Persuasive" (with Doechii) | 2022 | — | — | — | — | — | — | — | — | — | — | | She / Her / Black Bitch |
| "Shirt" | 2022 | 11 | 4 | 20 | 20 | 19 | 15 | 35 | 47 | 17 | 18 | RIAA: 4× Platinum; ARIA: Platinum; BPI: Gold; MC: 3× Platinum; RMNZ: 2× Platinum | SOS |
| "Nobody Gets Me" | 2023 | 10 | 2 | 16 | 10 | 12 | 10 | — | — (Note: "Nobody Gets Me" did not enter the Swedish Singellista Chart, but it peaked at number seven on the Swedish Heatseeker Chart.) | 27 | 12 | RIAA: 4× Platinum; ARIA: Gold; BPI: Platinum; MC: 4× Platinum; RMNZ: 3× Platinum | SOS |
| "Kill Bill" | 2023 | 1 | 1 | 1 | 3 | 3 | 1 | 5 | 5 | 3 | 1 | RIAA: Diamond; ARIA: 7× Platinum; BPI: 3× Platinum; GLF: Platinum; MC: Diamond; RMNZ: 6× Platinum | SOS |
| "Snooze" (solo or acoustic featuring Justin Bieber) | 2023 | 2 | 2 | 21 | 11 | 29 | 5 | — | 49 | 18 | 6 | RIAA: 11× Platinum; ARIA: 4× Platinum; BPI: 2× Platinum; GLF: Gold; MC: 7× Platinum; RMNZ: 6× Platinum | SOS |
| "No Szns" (with Jean Dawson) | 2023 | — | — | — | — | — | — (Note: "No Szns" did not enter the NZ Top 40 Singles Chart, but it peaked at number 10 on the NZ Hot Singles Chart.) | — | — | — | — | | Non-album single |
| "Saturn" | 2024 | 6 | 3 | 8 | 8 | 21 | 5 | — | 49 | 15 | 5 | RIAA: 4× Platinum; BPI: Platinum; MC: 3× Platinum; RMNZ: 3× Platinum | Lana |
| "Luther" (with Kendrick Lamar) | 2024 | 1 | 1 | 2 | 2 | 7 | 1 | 22 | 21 | 4 | 3 | ARIA: 4× Platinum; BPI: Platinum; RMNZ: 4× Platinum | GNX |
| "30 for 30" (with Kendrick Lamar) | 2025 | 10 | 4 | 39 | 31 | 55 | 22 | — | 96 | 33 | 27 | RIAA: 2× Platinum; BPI: Silver; MC: Platinum; RMNZ: Platinum | Lana |
| "BMF" | 2025 | 29 | — | 16 | 24 | 24 | 10 | — | — | 21 | 24 | RIAA: Platinum; BPI: Silver; MC: Platinum; RMNZ: Platinum | Lana |
| "Save the Day" | 2026 | — | — | — | — | — | — (Note: "Save the Day" did not enter the NZ Top 40 Singles Chart, but it peaked at number 26 on the NZ Hot Singles Chart.) | — | — | — (Note: "Save the Day" did not enter the UK Singles Chart, but it peaked at number 59 on the UK Physical Singles Chart.) | — | | Hoppers (Original Motion Picture Soundtrack) |
| "Boy in Red" (with Isaiah Rashad) | 2026 | — (Note: "Boy in Red" did not enter the Billboard Hot 100, but it peaked at number three on the Bubbling Under Hot 100 chart.) | — | — | — | — | — | — | — | — | — | | It's Been Awful |
"—" denotes a title that did not chart, or was not released in that territory.

=== As featured artist ===
List of singles
| Title | Year | Peak chart positions | | | | | | | | | | Certifications | Album |
| Title | Year | US | AUS | CAN | DEN | FRA | ITA | NLD | NZ | SWE | UK | Certifications | Album |
|---|---|---|---|---|---|---|---|---|---|---|---|---|---|
| "Ronnie Drake" (Isaiah Rashad featuring SZA) | 2013 | — | — | — | — | — | — | — | — | — | — | | Cilvia Demo |
| "Happy Birthday" (Childish Major featuring Isaiah Rashad and SZA) | 2016 | — | — | — | — | — | — | — | — | — | — | | Woosah |
| "Lies" (Felix Snow featuring SZA) | 2016 | — | — | — | — | — | — | — | — | — | — | | Non-album singles |
| "Bed (Reenacted)" (APSPDR+ featuring SZA, Nemo Achida, and Moruf) | 2016 | — | — | — | — | — | — | — | — | — | — | | Non-album singles |
| "What Lovers Do" (Maroon 5 featuring SZA) | 2017 | 9 | 7 | 6 | 12 | 16 | 8 | 10 | 6 | 12 | 12 | RIAA: 2× Platinum; ARIA: 7× Platinum; BPI: Platinum; FIMI: 3× Platinum; GLF: 3× Platinum; IFPI DEN: Platinum; MC: 4× Platinum; RMNZ: 5× Platinum; SNEP: Platinum | Red Pill Blues |
| "Homemade Dynamite" (remix) (Lorde featuring Khalid, Post Malone, and SZA) | 2017 | 92 | 23 | 54 | — | — | — | 92 | 20 | 84 | — | ARIA: 5× Platinum; MC: Platinum; RMNZ: Platinum | Melodrama |
| "Just Us" (DJ Khaled featuring SZA) | 2019 | 43 | 32 | 65 | — | — | — | — | 25 | — | 66 | RIAA: 2× Platinum; ARIA: Platinum; BPI: Silver; MC: Gold; RMNZ: Platinum | Father of Asahd |
| "Kiss Me More" (Doja Cat featuring SZA) | 2021 | 3 | 2 | 5 | 4 | 23 | 59 | 8 | 1 | 17 | 3 | RIAA: 5× Platinum; ARIA: 7× Platinum; BPI: 2× Platinum; FIMI: Platinum; GLF: Platinum; IFPI DEN: Platinum; MC: 4× Platinum; RMNZ: 7× Platinum; SNEP: Diamond | Planet Her |
| "Special" (Lizzo featuring SZA) | 2023 | 52 | — | 72 | — | — | — | — | — (Note: "Special" did not enter the NZ Top 40 Singles Chart, but it peaked at number 11 on the NZ Hot Singles Chart.) | — (Note: "Special" did not enter the Swedish Singellista Chart, but it peaked at number three on the Swedish Heatseeker Chart.) | — | | Non-album single |
| "Slime You Out" (Drake featuring SZA) | 2023 | 1 | 12 | 2 | 21 | 87 | 64 | 37 | 9 | 26 | 10 | RIAA: 2× Platinum; ARIA: Gold; BPI: Silver; RMNZ: Gold | For All the Dogs |
| "Rich Baby Daddy" (Drake featuring Sexyy Red and SZA) | 2023 | 11 | 11 | 18 | — | 152 | — | 74 | 9 | — (Note: "Rich Baby Daddy" did not enter the Swedish Singellista Chart, but it peaked at number one on the Swedish Heatseeker Chart.) | 10 | RIAA: 3× Platinum; ARIA: Platinum; BPI: Platinum; MC: 2× Platinum; RMNZ: 2× Platinum; SNEP: Gold | For All the Dogs |
| "PT Cruiser" (Moruf featuring SZA) | 2025 | — | — | — | — | — | — | — | — | — | — | | Moolodic: Hotep Luxury |
| "Girl, Get Up" (Doechii featuring SZA) | 2025 | 57 | — | 81 | — | — | — | — | — (Note: "Girl, Get Up" did not enter the NZ Top 40 Singles Chart, but it peaked at number 3 on the NZ Hot Singles Chart.) | — | 79 | | Non-album single |
| "Flower in a Hurricane" (Justice featuring Tame Impala, SZA, and King Gizzard & the Lizard Wizard) | 2026 | 62 | 17 | 42 | — | 50 | 57 | 97 | 27 | 43 | 9 | | Grand Theft Auto VI: The Album |
"—" denotes items which were not released in that country or failed to chart.

=== Promotional singles ===
List of promotional singles
| Title | Year | Peak chart positions | | | | | | | | Certifications | Album |
| Title | Year | US | US R&B/HH | US R&B | CAN | NZ | SWE | UK | WW | Certifications | Album |
|---|---|---|---|---|---|---|---|---|---|---|---|
| "Doves in the Wind" (featuring Kendrick Lamar) | 2017 | — (Note: "Doves in the Wind" did not enter the Billboard Hot 100, but it peaked at number 12 on the Bubbling Under Hot 100 chart.) | — (Note: "Doves in the Wind" did not enter the Billboard Hot R&B/Hip-Hop Songs chart, but it peaked at number two on the Bubbling Under Hot R&B/Hip-Hop Songs chart.) | 13 | — | — (Note: "Doves in the Wind" did not enter the NZ Top 40 Singles Chart, but it peaked at number six on the NZ Heatseeker Singles Chart.) | — | — | — | RIAA: 2× Platinum; BPI: Silver; MC: Platinum; RMNZ: Platinum | Ctrl |
| "Consideration" (Rihanna featuring SZA) | 2017 | — (Note: "Consideration" did not enter the Billboard Hot 100, but it peaked at number 13 on the Bubbling Under Hot 100 chart.) | 38 | 14 | — | — | 72 | 88 | — | RIAA: 2× Platinum; ARIA: Platinum; BPI: Gold; RMNZ: Platinum | Anti |
| "Drive" | 2025 | 51 | 8 | 3 | 76 | — (Note: "Drive" did not enter the NZ Top 40 Singles Chart, but it peaked at number six on the NZ Hot Singles Chart.) | — | — | 122 | RIAA: Gold | Lana |
| "Is It Cool?" (Steve Lacy featuring SZA) | 2026 | 80 | 23 | 8 | — | — (Note: "Is It Cool?" did not enter the NZ Top 40 Singles Chart, but it peaked at number 8 on the NZ Hot Singles Chart.) | — | — | — | | Oh Yeah? |
"—" denotes items which were not released in that country or failed to chart.

== Other charted and certified songs ==
List of songs
| Title | Year | Peak chart positions | | | | | | | | | | Certifications | Album |
| Title | Year | US | US R&B/HH | US R&B | AUS | CAN | NZ | SWE | UK | UK R&B | WW | Certifications | Album |
|---|---|---|---|---|---|---|---|---|---|---|---|---|---|
| "West Savannah" (Isaiah Rashad featuring SZA) | 2014 | — | — | — | — | — | — | — | — | — | — | RIAA: Gold | Cilvia Demo |
| "The Need to Know" (Wale featuring SZA) | 2015 | — | — | — | — | — | — | — | — | — | — | RIAA: Platinum; RMNZ: Gold | The Album About Nothing |
| "Supermodel" | 2017 | — | — | 23 | — | — | — | — | — | — | — | RIAA: 3× Platinum; BPI: Silver; MC: Platinum; RMNZ: Platinum | Ctrl |
| "Prom" | 2017 | — | — | — | — | — | — | — | — | — | — | RIAA: Platinum; RMNZ: Gold | Ctrl |
| "Go Gina" | 2017 | — | — | — | — | — | — | — | — | — | — | RIAA: Platinum; MC: Gold; RMNZ: Gold | Ctrl |
| "Anything" | 2017 | — | — | — | — | — | — | — | — | — | — | RIAA: Platinum | Ctrl |
| "Wavy (Interlude)" (featuring James Fauntleroy) | 2017 | — | — | — | — | — | — | — | — | — | — | RIAA: Gold | Ctrl |
| "Normal Girl" | 2017 | — | — | — | — | — | — | — | — | — | — | RIAA: 2× Platinum; MC: Platinum; RMNZ: Platinum | Ctrl |
| "Pretty Little Birds" (featuring Isaiah Rashad) | 2017 | — | — | — | — | — | — | — | — | — | — | RIAA: Platinum | Ctrl |
| "20 Something" | 2017 | — | — | — | — | — | — | — | — | — | — | RIAA: 2× Platinum; BPI: Silver; MC: Gold; RMNZ: Platinum | Ctrl |
| "I Do" (Cardi B featuring SZA) | 2018 | 23 | 16 | — | — | 38 | — | — | — | — | — | RIAA: 2× Platinum; ARIA: Platinum; BPI: Silver; RMNZ: Gold | Invasion of Privacy |
| "Staring at the Sun" (Post Malone featuring SZA) | 2019 | 34 | — | — | 48 | 38 | — | 71 | — | — | — | RIAA: Platinum; ARIA: Gold; MC: Platinum; RMNZ: Gold | Hollywood's Bleeding |
| "Freaky Girls" (Megan Thee Stallion featuring SZA) | 2020 | — (Note: "Freaky Girls" did not enter the Billboard Hot 100, but it peaked at number one on the Bubbling Under Hot 100 chart.) | 36 | — | — | — | — | — | — | — | 199 | | Good News |
| "Score" (Isaiah Rashad featuring SZA and 6lack) | 2021 | — | — | — | — | — | — (Note: "Score" did not enter the NZ Top 40 Singles Chart, but it peaked at number 24 on the NZ Hot Singles Chart.) | — | — | — | — | | The House Is Burning |
| "Coming Back" (James Blake featuring SZA) | 2021 | — | — | — | — | — | — (Note: "Coming Back" did not enter the NZ Top 40 Singles Chart, but it peaked at number 19 on the NZ Hot Singles Chart.) | — | — | — | — | | Friends That Break Your Heart |
| "Love Galore" (Alt version) | 2022 | — | — | — | — | — | — (Note: "Love Galore (Alt Version)" did not enter the NZ Top 40 Singles Chart, but it peaked at number 28 on the NZ Hot Singles Chart.) | — | — | — | — | | Ctrl (deluxe) |
| "Miles" | 2022 | — | — | 18 | — | — | — | — | — | — | — | | Ctrl (deluxe) |
| "Percolator" | 2022 | — | — | 16 | — | — | — | — | — | — | — | | Ctrl (deluxe) |
| "Tread Carefully" | 2022 | — (Note: "Tread Carefully" did not enter the Billboard Hot 100 chart, but it peaked at number 13 on the Bubbling Under Hot 100 chart.) | 41 | 9 | — | — | — (Note: "Tread Carefully" did not enter the NZ Top 40 Singles Chart, but it peaked at number 14 on the NZ Hot Singles Chart.) | — | — | — | — | RIAA: Gold | Ctrl (deluxe) |
| "Awkward" | 2022 | — | — | 17 | — | — | — (Note: "Awkward" did not enter the NZ Top 40 Singles Chart, but it peaked at number 27 on the NZ Hot Singles Chart.) | — | — | — | — | RIAA: Platinum; RMNZ: Platinum | Ctrl (deluxe) |
| "Jodie" | 2022 | — | — | 19 | — | — | — (Note: "Jodie" did not enter the NZ Top 40 Singles Chart, but it peaked at number 33 on the NZ Hot Singles Chart.) | — | — | — | — | | Ctrl (deluxe) |
| "Beautiful" (DJ Khaled featuring Future and SZA) | 2022 | 29 | 10 | — | — | 46 | — (Note: "Beautiful" did not enter the NZ Top 40 Singles Chart, but it peaked at number seven on the NZ Hot Singles Chart.) | — | 67 | 28 | 53 | RIAA: Gold | God Did |
| "SOS" | 2022 | 32 | 13 | 12 | 56 | 45 | — | — | — (Note: "SOS" did not enter the UK Singles Chart, but it peaked at number 82 on the UK Audio Streams Chart.) | — | 37 | RIAA: Platinum; MC: Gold | SOS |
| "Seek & Destroy" | 2022 | 24 | 9 | 8 | 38 | 30 | — | — | — (Note: "Seek & Destroy" did not enter the UK Singles Chart, but it peaked at number 73 on the UK Audio Streams Chart.) | 36 | 27 | RIAA: Platinum; MC: Platinum; RMNZ: Gold | SOS |
| "Low" | 2022 | 17 | 6 | 5 | 34 | 21 | 36 | — | 78 | 36 | 24 | RIAA: 3× Platinum; ARIA: Gold; BPI: Gold; MC: 3× Platinum | SOS |
| "Love Language" | 2022 | 21 | 8 | 7 | 31 | 31 | — | — | — (Note: "Love Language" did not enter the UK Singles Chart, but it peaked at number 75 on the UK Audio Streams Chart.) | 31 | 26 | RIAA: 2× Platinum; BPI: Silver; MC: Platinum; RMNZ: Platinum | SOS |
| "Blind" | 2022 | 12 | 3 | 3 | 27 | 17 | 15 | — | — (Note: "Blind" did not enter the UK Singles Chart, but it peaked at number 59 on the UK Audio Streams Chart.) | — | 19 | RIAA: 2× Platinum; BPI: Silver; MC: Platinum; RMNZ: Platinum | SOS |
| "Used" (featuring Don Toliver) | 2022 | 30 | 12 | 11 | 50 | 35 | — | — | — (Note: "Used" did not enter the UK Singles Chart, but it peaked at number 81 on the UK Audio Streams Chart.) | — | 34 | RIAA: Platinum; MC: Platinum; RMNZ: Gold | SOS |
| "Notice Me" | 2022 | 44 | 20 | 18 | 85 | 55 | — | — | — | — | 62 | RIAA: Platinum; MC: Gold | SOS |
| "Gone Girl" | 2022 | 43 | 19 | 17 | 86 | 56 | — | — | — | — | 61 | RIAA: Platinum; MC: Gold | SOS |
| "Smoking on My Ex Pack" | 2022 | 52 | 23 | 21 | — | 61 | — | — | — | — | 71 | RIAA: Platinum; MC: Gold | SOS |
| "Ghost in the Machine" (featuring Phoebe Bridgers) | 2022 | 40 | 17 | 15 | 72 | 46 | — | — | — (Note: "Ghost in the Machine" did not enter the UK Singles Chart, but it peaked at number 96 on the UK Audio Streams Chart.) | — | 52 | RIAA: Platinum; BPI: Silver; MC: Platinum; RMNZ: Gold | SOS |
| "F2F" | 2022 | 55 | — | — | 87 | 54 | — | — | — | — | 69 | RIAA: Platinum; BPI: Silver; MC: Platinum; RMNZ: Gold | SOS |
| "Conceited" | 2022 | 58 | 27 | 23 | — | 62 | — | — | — | — | 83 | RIAA: Gold; MC: Gold | SOS |
| "Special" | 2022 | 37 | 16 | 14 | 47 | 38 | — | — | — (Note: "Special" did not enter the UK Singles Chart, but it peaked at number 80 on the UK Audio Streams Chart.) | — | 49 | RIAA: Platinum; MC: Platinum; RMNZ: Gold | SOS |
| "Too Late" | 2022 | 62 | 30 | 25 | — | 65 | — | — | — | — | 95 | RIAA: Gold; MC: Gold | SOS |
| "Far" | 2022 | 61 | 29 | 24 | — | 71 | — | — | — | — | 97 | RIAA: Platinum; MC: Gold | SOS |
| "Open Arms" (featuring Travis Scott) | 2022 | 54 | 24 | 19 | 81 | 51 | 29 | — | 63 | — | 67 | RIAA: 3× Platinum; BPI: Gold; MC: 3× Platinum; RMNZ: 2× Platinum | SOS |
| "Forgiveless" (featuring Ol' Dirty Bastard) | 2022 | 76 | 35 | — | — | 99 | — | — | — | — | 164 | RIAA: Gold | SOS |
| "Telekinesis" (Travis Scott featuring SZA and Future) | 2023 | 26 | 9 | — | 19 | 18 | 13 | 74 | 31 | 15 | 23 | RIAA: Platinum; ARIA: Gold; BPI: Silver; MC: 2× Platinum | Utopia |
| "Gloria" (with Kendrick Lamar) | 2024 | 27 | 13 | — | 51 | 40 | 23 | — (Note: "Gloria" did not enter the Swedish Singellista Chart, but it peaked at number five on the Swedish Heatseeker Chart.) | — | — (Note: "Gloria" did not enter the UK Singles Chart, but it peaked at number 68 on the UK Audio Streams Chart.) | 32 | | GNX |
| "No More Hiding" | 2024 | 69 | 12 | 7 | — | 93 | — | — | — | — | 191 | | Lana |
| "What Do I Do" | 2024 | 62 | 10 | 5 | — | 73 | — | — | — | — | 165 | | Lana |
| "Diamond Boy (DTM)" | 2024 | 60 | 9 | 4 | — | 80 | — | — | — | 39 | 146 | RIAA: Gold | Lana |
| "Scorsese Baby Daddy" | 2024 | 41 | — | — | — | 66 | — | — | 75 | 31 | 140 | RIAA: Gold | Lana |
| "Love Me 4 Me" | 2024 | 79 | 16 | 11 | — | — | — | — | — | — | — | | Lana |
| "Chill Baby" | 2024 | 80 | 17 | 12 | — | — | — | — | — | — | — | | Lana |
| "My Turn" | 2024 | 81 | 18 | 13 | — | — | — | — | — | — | — | | Lana |
| "Crybaby" | 2024 | 70 | 13 | 8 | — | 93 | — | — | — | — | 196 | RIAA: Gold | Lana |
| "Kitchen" | 2024 | 71 | 14 | 9 | — | 90 | — (Note: "Kitchen" did not enter the NZ Top 40 Singles Chart, but it peaked at number seven on the NZ Hot Singles Chart.) | — | — | 29 | — | | Lana |
| "Get Behind Me (Interlude)" | 2024 | — (Note: "Get Behind Me (Interlude)" did not enter the Billboard Hot 100, but it peaked at number two on the Bubbling Under Hot 100 chart.) | 31 | 15 | — | — | — | — | — | — | — | | Lana |
| "Another Life" | 2024 | 64 | 15 | 10 | — | 65 | — | — | — | 32 | — | RIAA: Gold | Lana |
| "DJ's Chord Organ" (Mac Miller featuring SZA) | 2025 | 95 | 23 | — | — | — | — (Note: "DJ's Chord Organ" did not enter the NZ Top 40 Singles Chart, but it peaked at number three on the NZ Hot Singles Chart.) | — | — | — | — | | Balloonerism |
| "Joni" (featuring Don Toliver) | 2025 | — | — | — | — | — | — (Note: "Joni" did not enter the NZ Top 40 Singles Chart, but it peaked at number 35 on the NZ Hot Singles Chart.) | — | — | — | — | | Lana |
| "Take You Down" | 2025 | — | — | — | — | — | — (Note: "Take You Down" did not enter the NZ Top 40 Singles Chart, but it peaked at number 26 on the NZ Hot Singles Chart.) | — | — | — | — | | Lana |
| "Open Arms (Just SZA)" | 2025 | — (Note: "Open Arms (Just SZA)" did not enter the Billboard Hot 100, but it peaked at number eight on the Bubbling Under Hot 100 chart.) | 47 | — | — | — | — (Note: "Open Arms (Just SZA)" did not enter the NZ Top 40 Singles Chart, but it peaked at number 13 on the NZ Hot Singles Chart.) | — | — | — | — | | Lana |
"—" denotes items which were not released in that country or failed to chart.

== Other guest appearances ==
List of non-charting, non-single guest appearances
| Title | Year | Other performer(s) | Album |
|---|---|---|---|
| "Tomorrow" | 2013 | Kris Kasanova | 24K |
| "West Savannah" | 2014 | Isaiah Rashad | Cilvia Demo |
| "His & Her Fiend" | 2014 | Schoolboy Q | Oxymoron |
| "God's Reign" | 2014 | Ab-Soul | These Days... |
| "9" | 2014 | Willow | 3 |
| "Real Thing" | 2014 | ASAP Ferg | Ferg Forever |
| "The Need to Know" | 2015 | Wale | The Album About Nothing |
| "U" | 2015 | Kendrick Lamar | To Pimp a Butterfly |
| "For Sale? (Interlude)" | 2015 | Kendrick Lamar | To Pimp a Butterfly |
| "Easy Bake" | 2015 | Jay Rock, Kendrick Lamar | 90059 |
| "Caretaker" | 2015 | DRAM | Gahdamn! |
| "Untitled 04 | 08.14.2014" | 2016 | Kendrick Lamar | Untitled Unmastered |
| "Neva Change" | 2016 | Schoolboy Q | Blank Face LP |
| "Stuck in the Mud" | 2016 | Isaiah Rashad | The Sun's Tirade |
| "Lonely Soul" / "The Law (Prelude)" | 2016 | Ab-Soul, Punch | Do What Thou Wilt. |
| "What Is Love" | 2017 | Kingdom | Tears in the Club |
| "Down 4 Whatever" | 2017 | Kingdom | Tears in the Club |
| "Morning View" | 2018 | Towkio | WWW. |
| "Redemption" | 2018 | Jay Rock | Redemption |
| "About a Gemini, Pt. 3" | 2022 | ImaniCarolyn | Into the Blue Light |
| "Never Lose Me" | 2024 | Flo Milli, Cardi B | Fine Ho, Stay |
| "IRL" | 2025 | Lizzo | My Face Hurts from Smiling |
| "Take Me Dancing" | 2025 | Doja Cat | Vie |
| "See You in My Dreams" | 2026 | Victoria Monét | Frequency of Love |

== Music videos ==
List of music video appearances, indicating, where applicable, the associated album, directors, and other performers
| Title | Year | Other performer(s) | Director(s) | Album | Ref. |
|---|---|---|---|---|---|
| "Everyone Nose" (Note: Cameo appearance) | 2009 | N.E.R.D. | Diane Martel | Seeing Sounds | |
| "Time Travel Undone" | 2012 | —N/a | Unknown | See.SZA.Run | |
| "Country" | 2012 | —N/a | Unknown | See.SZA.Run | |
| "Ice.Moon" | 2013 | —N/a | Lemar & Dauley | S | |
| "Teen Spirit" | 2013 | —N/a | Fredo Tovar, Scott Fleishman, and SZA | Non-album single | |
| "Tomorrow" | 2013 | Kris Kasanova | Anthony Sylvester | 24K | |
| "Babylon" | 2014 | —N/a | APlusFilmz and SZA | Z | |
| "Warm Winds" | 2014 | Isaiah Rashad | APlusFilmz and SZA | Z | |
| "Julia" / "Tender" | 2014 | —N/a | Rodney Passé | Z | |
| "Ronnie Drake" | 2014 | Isaiah Rashad | Fredo Tovar and Scott Fleishman | Cilvia Demo | |
| "These Walls" | 2015 | Kendrick Lamar | Colin Tilley and The Little Homies | To Pimp a Butterfly | |
| "Love Galore" | 2017 | Travis Scott | Nabil Elderkin | Ctrl | |
| "Drew Barrymore" | 2017 | —N/a | Dave Meyers | Ctrl | |
| "Supermodel" | 2017 | —N/a | Nabil Elderkin | Ctrl | |
| "The Weekend" | 2017 | —N/a | Solange Knowles | Ctrl | |
| "What Lovers Do" | 2017 | Maroon 5 | Joseph Kahn | Red Pill Blues | |
| "All the Stars" | 2018 | Kendrick Lamar | Dave Meyers and the Little Homies (Note: Consisting of Kendrick Lamar and Dave Free) | Black Panther: The Album | |
| "Broken Clocks" | 2018 | —N/a | SZA and Dave Free | Ctrl | |
| "Doves in the Wind" | 2018 | Kendrick Lamar | Nabil Elderkin | Ctrl | |
| "This Is America" | 2018 | Donald Glover | Hiro Murai | Non-album single | |
| "Garden (Say It like Dat)" | 2018 | —N/a | Karena Evans | Ctrl | |
| "Power Is Power" | 2019 | The Weeknd, Travis Scott | Anthony Mandler | For the Throne: Music Inspired by the HBO Series Game of Thrones | |
| "Just Us" | 2019 | DJ Khaled | Joseph Kahn | Father of Asahd | |
| "The Other Side" | 2020 | Justin Timberlake | Daniel Russell | Trolls World Tour: Original Motion Picture Soundtrack | |
| "Hit Different" | 2020 | Ty Dolla Sign | SZA | Non-album single | |
| "Good Days" | 2021 | —N/a | SZA | SOS | |
| "Kiss Me More" | 2021 | Doja Cat | Warren Fu | Planet Her | |
| "The Anonymous Ones" | 2021 | —N/a | Colin Tilley | Dear Evan Hansen: Original Motion Picture Soundtrack | |
| "No Love" (extended version) | 2022 | Summer Walker, Cardi B | Lacey Duke | Still Over It | |
| "Beautiful" | 2022 | DJ Khaled, Future | Colin Tilley | God Did | |
| "Persuasive" | 2022 | Doechii | Sara Lacombe | She / Her / Black Bitch | |
| "Shirt" | 2022 | —N/a | Dave Meyers | SOS | |
| "Nobody Gets Me" | 2022 | —N/a | Bradley J. Calder | SOS | |
| "Kill Bill" | 2023 | —N/a | Christian Breslauer | SOS | |
| "K-pop" | 2023 | Travis Scott, Bad Bunny, the Weeknd | Travis Scott | Utopia | |
| "Snooze" | 2023 | —N/a | Bradley J. Calder and SZA | SOS | |
| "No Szns" | 2023 | Jean Dawson | Jean Dawson and Bradley J. Calder | Non-album single | |
| "Rich Baby Daddy" | 2024 | Drake, Sexyy Red | Drake | For All the Dogs | |
| "Drive" | 2024 | —N/a | Bradley J. Calder | Lana | |
| "Luther" | 2025 | Kendrick Lamar | Karena Evans | GNX | |
| "PT Cruiser" | 2025 | Moruf | Joshua Kissi | Non-album singles | |
| "Girl, Get Up" | 2025 | Doechii | James Mackel | Non-album singles | |

== Songwriting credits ==
List of songs
| Title | Year | Artist | Album | Ref. |
|---|---|---|---|---|
| "Feeling Myself" (featuring Beyoncé) | 2014 | Nicki Minaj | The Pinkprint | |
| "Ok Alright" (featuring Schoolboy Q) | 2015 | Travis Scott | Rodeo | |
| "Just Sing" | 2020 | Trolls World Tour cast | Trolls World Tour: Original Motion Picture Soundtrack | |
| "Anybody" | 2023 | Maeta | When I Hear Your Name | |
