= Z (EP) =

EP by SZA
- Released: April 8, 2014
- Recorded: 2013
- Studio: TDE Red Room (Carson, California)
- Genres: Alternative R&B; neo soul
- Length: 40:41
- Label: TDE
- Producers: Antydote; Dae One; DJ Dahi; Larry Fisherman; Marvin Gaye; Emile Haynie; Felix Snow; SoulCtrl; Toro y Moi; XXYYXX

SZA chronology
| S (2013) | Z (2014) | Ctrl (2017) |

Z is the third extended play by American singer-songwriter SZA. It was released on April 8, 2014, by Top Dawg Entertainment (TDE). After amassing two self-released EPs, See.SZA.Run and S, as well as meeting with members of Top Dawg Entertainment, she subsequently signed a recording contract with the indie label. The recording of the mixtape took place in Carson, California during the summer of 2013 with the help of her TDE labelmate Isaiah Rashad, among others.

An alternative R&B and neo soul album, Z has a diverse musical style that incorporates contemporary urban genres such as soul, hip hop, and minimalist R&B, as well as 1980s synth-pop elements. Its production is characterized by layers of sliced, delayed, and reversed vocals, which are synthetic and fluid. Its lyrics explore the complexities of romantic relationships, sexuality, nostalgia, and abandonment. The album was written by SZA herself, with production handled by Mac Miller, Emile Haynie and others.

Z received generally positive reviews from music critics, who commended its production and musical style. Critics also praised the EP's lyrical content and SZA's vocals, as well as comparing the mixtape to the work of singer and songwriter Lorde. Z debuted on the US Billboard 200 at number thirty-nine, selling 6,980 copies in its opening week. It peaked at number nine on the US Hip-Hop/R&B chart. To date, the EP has sold over 26,000 copies in the US.

== Background ==
SZA first met members of Top Dawg Entertainment at the CMJ 2011, when her boyfriend's clothing company sponsored a show in which Kendrick Lamar was performing. A friend attending the show with her foisted early SZA songs onto TDE president Terrence "Punch" Henderson, who liked the material and stayed in touch. On October 29, 2012, SZA released her debut self-released extended play entitled See.SZA.Run, which featured production from brandUn DeShay and APSuperProducer, among others. In June 2013, Top Dawg Entertainment announced they were planning to sign two more artists. On July 14, it was revealed Top Dawg had signed the upcoming singer SZA to the label. SZA's intention was to release another EP, but she felt she owed "people more", leading her to release the full-length album.

== Recording ==
SZA said the public could expect to hear a "completely different level of insight" into her life through this album. She described the recording process as not being "rushed or afraid", and that she had "vocal freedom" during the process. During the writing process SZA felt she "ran out of shit to say", which led her to force herself to "dig deeper... It's funny because I get to choose all these crazy producers who I never got to work with before, so I'm getting to know myself around some of the most creative minds ever." In May 2013, SZA revealed that she had been working with producers Holy Other and Emile Haynie, the latter of whom had previously worked with Lana Del Rey and Kid Cudi.

The majority of Z was recorded in Carson, California in the summer of 2013, in a "little club house" along with labelmate Isaiah Rashad. The experience gave SZA a crucial ally within the crew, and the two have since made a habit of collaborating. About recording the EP, SZA said, "Him and all his producers would kick open my door in the morning and jump on the bed and light blunts at 9 AM... Now we're each other's security blanket, in a way. We just get each other really well." SZA met producer Felix Snow via a mutual friend and they later began "hanging out". SZA described him as being "completely not the textbook producer". On working with Felix, SZA said,

If you've ever seen him he wears sunglasses inside all day and sandals all year round. He's basically always in yacht mode. He has a Tamagachi and a Giga Pet, so he's a character-and-a-half. But we're like family. I went to his house in Connecticut and played with his menagerie of animals and met his parents and ate soup.

== Composition ==
Z contains alternative, synth-pop, modern R&B style, neo soul, and hip hop genres; the album's instrumentals "vary in groove". The album's production is characterized as being "mainly synthetic" with guitar work scattered throughout. Z featured a "genre agnostic utopia dripping with mood"; the album was described as straddling the "line between minimalist R&B, '80s synth pop and soul". The production is "consistently fluid" and built over "layers of sliced, delayed, and reversed vocals."

The album has "unraveling lyrics" that touch upon themes of sexuality, nostalgia, and abandonment, and which have been compared to the work of Lorde. SZA's vocals were described as merging and melting into the album's production, creating a "chilled aesthetic". According to Michael Madden from Consequence of Sound, Z follows in the same vein as her previous EPs See.SZA.Run and S; Madden noted that, like her previous work, Z sounds "organic and self-sufficient. The tricky part is getting to that point". He described the album's genre as being "agnostic", noting that Z is not just one style of music and is versatile, with a musical style that is not just "R&B, pop, soul, or one thing at all". Madden described the album's lyrical content as sometimes being "purposefully general" and sometimes "an ambitious but quick reference", which he compared to the rapper Angel Haze and their debut album Dirty Gold.

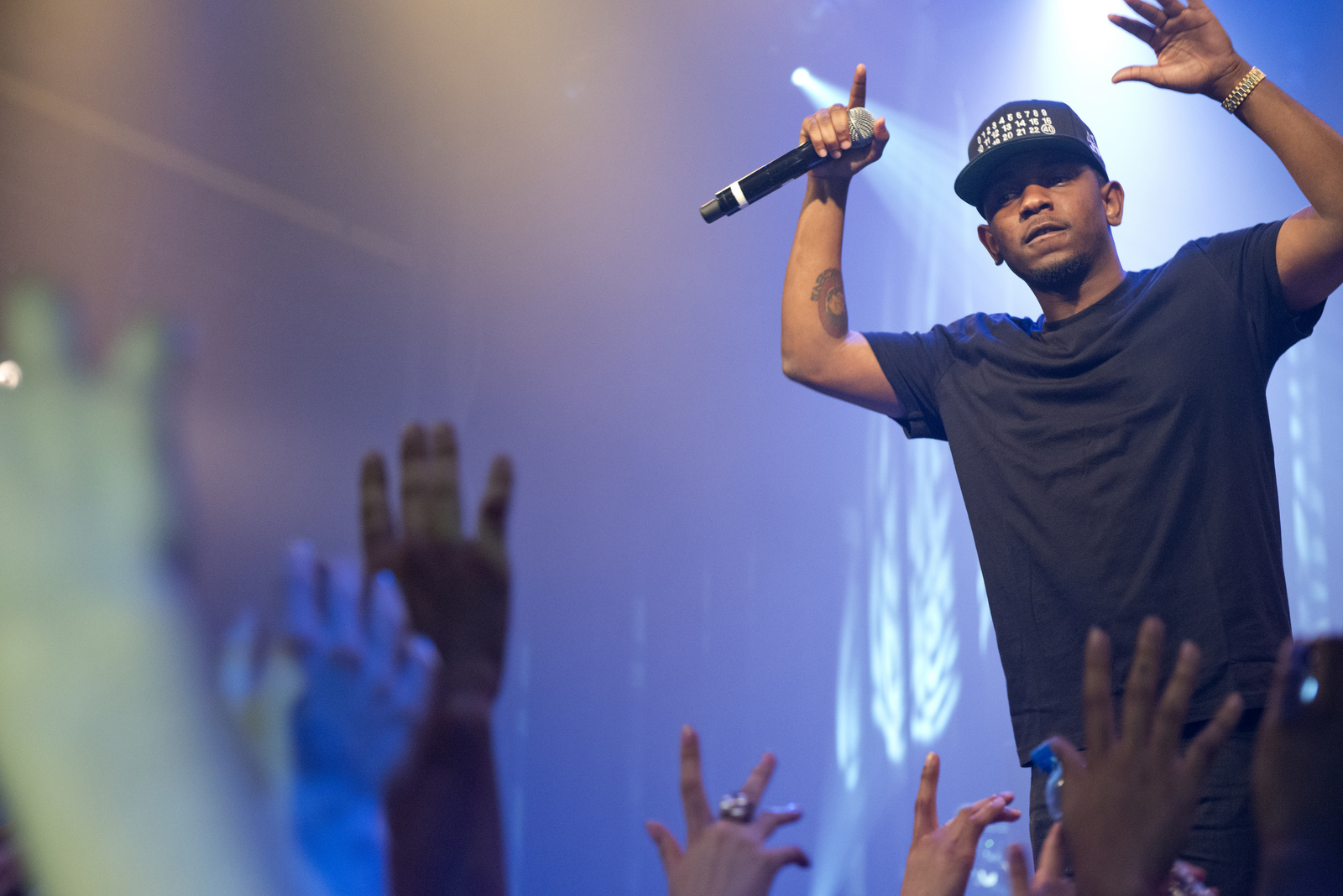
Kendrick Lamar features on "Babylon", an "alt-R&B" song

The album opens with "U R", a "slow-moving, emotional track" that was produced by rapper Mac Miller. It is a "disorienting" song that is built over a variety of instrumentals featuring "twangy guitar, subtle synthesizers, echoing vocals, delicate piano chords, and futuristic sound effects." The musical style then moves into a more upbeat, energetic set of songs. "Child's Play" features rapper Chance the Rapper. It was produced by DAE ONE and XXYYXX, and contains minimalist drums and synths. Its lyrics mention Nintendo and Street Fighter.

"Julia" is an uptempo synth-pop song that contains a "danceable, energetic vibe" described as being built on a "glorious" and "glittering" production, with lyrics that revolve around romantic relationships. The album's fourth song, the two-part "Warm Winds", features rapper and labelmate Isaiah Rashad, whose vocals have been described as sounding like backing vocals. "HiiiJack" is a R&B song produced by Toro y Moi, whose lyrics are about love. "Green Mile" was compared to the work of singer Jessie Ware, and is built over a "crashing" sound with a "dark, shady beat". Lyrically the song describes the difficult ending of a relationship and the "massacre" of love.

"Babylon" is an "alt-R&B" song featuring rapper Kendrick Lamar and produced by DJ Dahi. It has been described as having an "airy, mystical croon" coupled with Lamar's "fluid, and at times ravenous, flow". "Sweet November" is musically more upbeat than some of the EP's previous material. It contains "breathy" vocals and guitar riffs, while its lyrics are about "love and life lessons". The song contains guitar, piano and organ instruments and a sample of Marvin Gaye's "Mandota", which was originally featured on the deluxe edition of his 1973 album Let's Get It On. "Shattered Ring" is a pop song that contains "haunting vocals" and "guitar tabs", as well as borrowing "songwriting and vocal cues from country and acoustic music." "Omega" is a R&B song that is described as "goth-hop" with "bold and oblique" elements.

== Marketing and sales ==
After appearing on a variety of songs by her fellow Top Dawg Entertainment artists, SZA announced the title and release date of her next EP, and released a new video. It was announced that the EP titled Z would be released on April 8, 2014. Prior to its release, Metacritic named the EP as one of their "45 Notable Upcoming Albums" during March and May, calling it a "noteworthy album". The same company also placed the album on their "Most Anticipated Albums" of 2014. To promote the Z EP, SZA performed at several performance showcases at the SXSW Music Festival in Austin, Texas.

The EP was preceded by the release of video of the lead single, "Babylon", which was directed by APLUSFILMZ. The visuals feature SZA leaving her unimportant essentials behind as she gets baptized in the swamp's murky waters. On March 26, 2014, SZA released the single "Child's Play", featuring Chance the Rapper. On May 14, 2014, SZA released a music video for the song "Warm Winds", featuring Isaiah Rashad. The video was directed by APLUSFILMZ, and depicts SZA and Rashad running through a field and walking down a deserted path. On July 11, 2014, SZA released a video for "Julia" from the EP, which featured a snippet of a new song entitled "Tender".

Z made its chart debut in the United Kingdom, where it charted at number 32 on the UK R&B Chart, the week ending April 19, 2014, and at number 197 on the UK Albums Chart. Z debuted on the US Billboard 200 at number 39, selling 6,980 copies in its first week of availability, where it charted for just one week. The album also debuted at number nine on the US Top R&B/Hip-Hop Albums chart and at number five on the US Top R&B Albums chart, where it charted for three weeks on the former and four weeks on the latter. To date, the EP has sold over 26,000 copies in the US.

== Critical reception ==
Professional ratings
Aggregate scores
| Source | Rating |
|---|---|
| AnyDecentMusic? | 6.4/10 |
| Metacritic | 66/100 |
Review scores
| Source | Rating |
| AllMusic | 3/5 stars |
| Consequence of Sound | B− |
| Exclaim! | 8/10 |
| HipHopDX | 3.5/5 stars |
| Pitchfork | 5.9/10 |
| Spin | 6/10 |

At Metacritic, which assigns a weighted mean rating out of 100 to reviews from mainstream critics, the album received an average score of 66, based on 15 reviews, which indicates "generally favorable reviews". Ben Benjamin of Neon Tommy praised Z, comparing it to the work of singer Lorde and calling Z "compelling", yet "slightly static". He felt it worked well within its "narrow dynamic range", but noted that the album's end began "one of the few adrenaline boosters on the entire record", in which SZA had an "aptitude for injecting deep listening into songs that will please even the shallowest ears". Ryan B. Patrick from Exclaim! gave Z eight out of ten stars, calling the work a "quality beginning" and praised the "fresh futurist sound". He noted "Sweet November" and "Julia" as standout tracks.

Steven Goldstein from HipHopDX gave the album three and half stars out of five; he called it a strong debut. He praised the album's "nostalgic trance about heartbreak and self-questioning." On the other hand, Goldstein felt that sometimes SZA fell "victim to Pop platitudes". Brandon Soderberg from Spin magazine commended the album's "atmospheric" tones and called the album's lyrical content "compelling". However, he felt the "elements melt into the background" and described the genre as "weeded R&B". Writing for Consequence of Sound, Michael Madden commended the "organic" themes but felt the album did not "get to the point". He praised SZA's vocals, calling them her "biggest asset".

The album was included on year-end critics' lists, including Exclaim!, who placed the album at number eight on their Soul and R&B albums list. Z was thirty-four on Vibe Magazine's end-of-year list, and number ten on Sweden's Nöjesguiden international list.

== Track listing ==
All tracks are written by Solána Rowe.

| No. | Title | Producer(s) | Length |
|---|---|---|---|
| 1. | "Ur" | Larry Fisherman | 3:55 |
| 2. | "Childs Play" (featuring Chance the Rapper) | XXYYXX; DAE ONE; SoulCtrl | 3:36 |
| 3. | "Julia" | Felix Snow | 3:39 |
| 4. | "Warm Winds" (with Isaiah Rashad) | Fisherman; Antydote | 5:50 |
| 5. | "HiiiJack" | Toro y Moi | 3:42 |
| 6. | "Green Mile" | Emile Haynie | 3:34 |
| 7. | "Babylon" (featuring Kendrick Lamar) | DJ Dahi SoulCtrl | 3:54 |
| 8. | "Sweet November" | Marvin Gaye | 4:03 |
| 9. | "Shattered Ring" | Haynie | 4:05 |
| 10. | "Omega" | Haynie | 4:23 |
| Total length: | | | 40:41 |

== Charts ==
| Chart (2014) | Peak position |
|---|---|
| UK Albums (Official Charts) | 197 |
| UK Independent Albums (Official Charts) | 40 |
| UK R&B Albums (Official Charts) | 32 |
| US Billboard 200 | 39 |
| US Independent Albums (Billboard) | 7 |
| US Top R&B/Hip-Hop Albums (Billboard) | 9 |

== Release history ==
| Region | Date | Format | Label |
|---|---|---|---|
| United States | April 8, 2014 | Digital download | Top Dawg |
