= Smoking on My Ex Pack =

Song by SZA

from the album SOS
- Released: December 9, 2022
- Genre: Hip hop; boom bap
- Length: 1:23
- Label: Top Dawg; RCA
- Songwriters: Solána Rowe; Jahlil Gunter; Skip Scarborough; Raina Taylor
- Producer: Jay Versace

Lyric video
- "Smoking on My Ex Pack" on YouTube

"Smoking on My Ex Pack" is a song by American singer-songwriter SZA from her second studio album, SOS (2022). The second of the album's three rap tracks, it is a boom bap song with a chipmunk soul production style, fusing hard-hitting drum beats with a sped-up sample of Webster Lewis's "Open Up Your Eyes" (1981). Before SOS, SZA had been known as an R&B artist who made "sad girl" music, a narrative she wanted to dispel because she viewed it as reductive. Particularly, she believed her being categorized strictly as R&B was racially insensitive. As such, she wanted to experiment with "aggressive" hip hop music for SOS, leading to the conception of "Smoking on My Ex Pack". Its producer was Jay Versace, to whom SZA credited her first attempts at rap music.

In the lyrics, SZA makes braggadocious comments about her sexual desirability and ridicules her past lovers in various ways, for instance insulting their penises. Her rapping originally lasted for over two minutes, but she had the song cut in half because she was unsure if the rapping was good enough. Critics in contemporary reviews felt otherwise and found the songwriting effectively harsh and the flow satisfactory, believing it showcased SZA's potential to become a proper rapper. Some deemed "Smoking on My Ex Pack" a highlight of SOS or of her discography. After the album's release, the song charted in the US and Canada, reached number 71 on the Billboard Global 200, and was included in the set list of the SOS Tour.

== Background ==
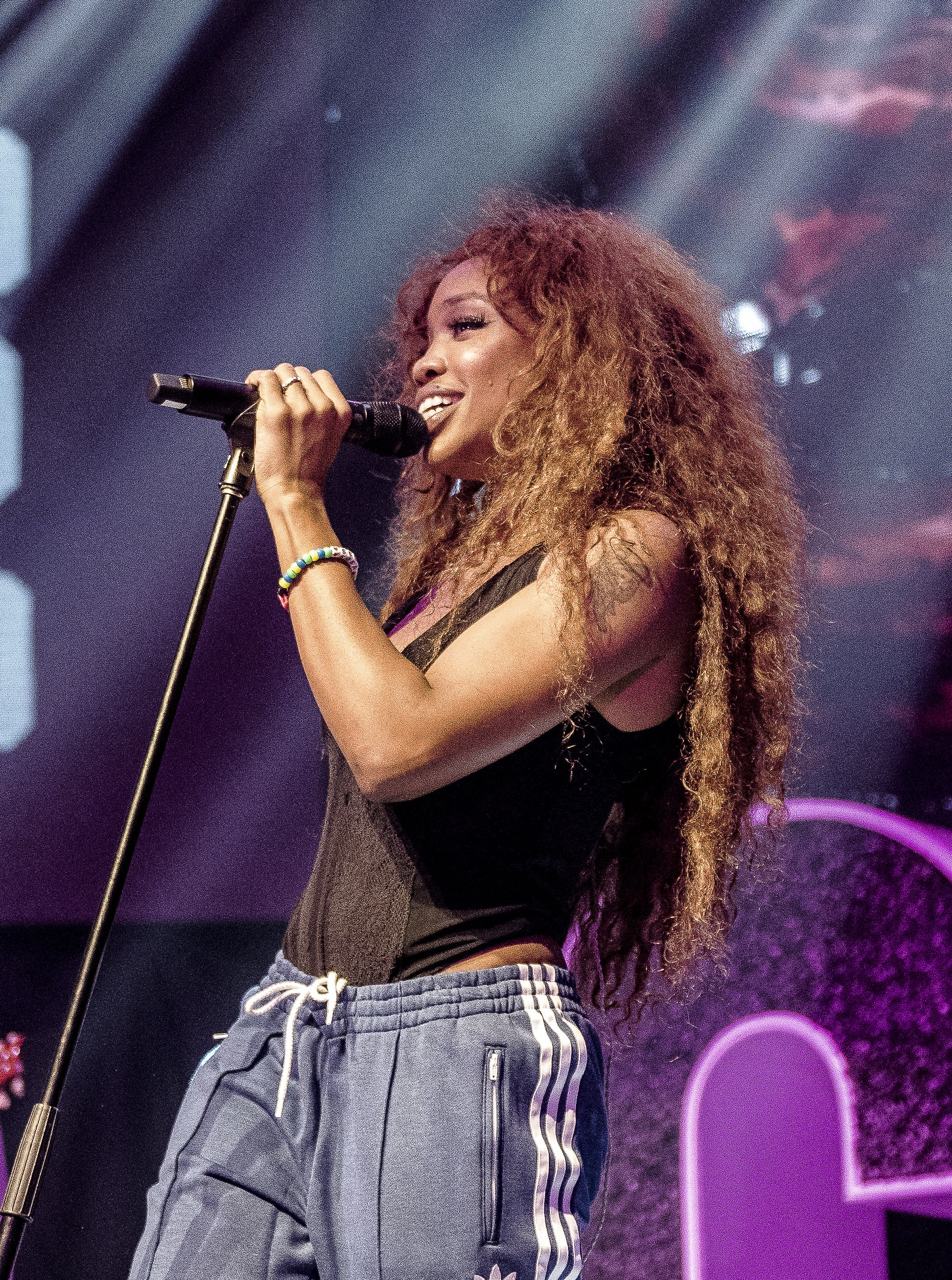
SZA during the Ctrl the Tour in Toronto, Canada (2017)

SZA released her debut studio album, Ctrl, in 2017. Primarily an R&B album that deals with themes like heartbreak, it received widespread acclaim for SZA's vocals and the eclectic musical style, as well as the emotional impact and confessional nature of its songwriting. The album brought SZA to mainstream fame, and critics credit it with establishing her status as a major figure in contemporary pop and R&B music and pushing the boundaries of the R&B genre. (Note: Vulture, The Recording Academy, The Line of Best Fit, NME, The Daily Telegraph, The New Yorker, and Consequence cited these qualities as the reason for the success of Ctrl and SZA's impact on the pop and R&B scene.) Her next studio album was highly anticipated by fans and music critics alike, and as early as August 2019 she alluded to its completion "soon", during an interview with DJ Kerwin Frost.

From April to May 2022, SZA told media outlets that she had recently finished the album in Hawaii and said that it was coming soon. Wanting to experiment with genres she had not yet incorporated in her discography, SZA envisioned it to be an amalgamation of disparate musical styles, or in her words, "a little bit of everything". While some tracks were balladic or soft, certain others had an "aggressive" sound. Apart from the "traditional" R&B that had been a staple of SZA's past works, the album also contained prominent elements of hip hop music.

== Music and production ==
SZA wanted to include rap as a major element of her second studio album, SOS (2022). The media tended to categorize her as an R&B artist, and she staunchly disagreed with the description. In her view, she was being described strictly as R&B because she was a Black woman, to which she asserted: "I love making Black music, period. Something that is just full of energy. Black music doesn't have to just be R&B [...] Why can't we just be expansive and not reductive?"

According to Punch, president of SZA's record label Top Dawg Entertainment, SZA recorded an "[extended play]'s worth" of strictly rap records during the making of SOS. (Note: Whether Punch was referring to the amount of rapping in SOS or an unreleased collection of rap songs is unclear.) The final product contains three rap tracks—one in the beginning, one in the end, and one in the middle. The rap track in the middle is titled "Smoking on My Ex Pack". (Note: Two other songs, "Low" and "Blind", prominently incorporate rap delivery.) The song's composition incorporates chipmunk soul, a production style that uses looped, sped-up samples of soul music; in the case of "Smoking on My Ex Pack", the song sampled is Webster Lewis's "Open Up Your Eyes" (1981). "Smoking on My Ex Pack" is a boom bap song, built around hard-hitting drum beats.

Jay Versace, a record producer and former comedian, produced "Smoking on My Ex Pack". Versace, whom SZA credited with getting her interested in creating "aggressive" rap music, created the beat sometime in 2022, three years after the two first met up for the album's recording sessions. He was inspired by the boom bap music he had heard growing up, much of which played on his car radio when he was driving with his father. For "Smoking on My Ex Pack", he wanted SZA's take on these childhood songs: "I literally made that for her [...] That was specifically for her."

Versace chose to sample "Open Up Your Eyes" because of his interest in love ballads from the latter half of the 20th century, citing the "really crazy instrumentation in their music". Particularly, he liked the song's horns and vocals, so he created the sample in Ableton and formed a beat around it. Once he finished, he sent the audio file to SZA, who started writing the lyrics almost immediately. About the production, she texted him: "Your beats are so easy to write to. Why am I already writing lyrics right now?"

== Lyrics ==
SZA said that while creating SOS, she learned that sometimes she could act like a villainous "bitch" and that she had to come to terms with this perception of herself. According to her, many songs on the album centered around themes of revenge and "being pissed" to a degree that she had never felt before. She described how these feelings manifested in its tracks: "It is in the way I say no [...] It's in the fucked up things that I don't apologize for." Versace encouraged her to "talk her shit" on "Smoking on My Ex Pack", the lyrics to which she wrote to dispel a narrative that she only made "sad girl music". Its initial version was over two minutes long, but SZA scrapped the song's first half because she did not feel confident enough in her rapping skills.

The released version of "Smoking on My Ex Pack" is 1 minute and 23 seconds long. Spin compared its lyrics to blind items, or articles that do not disclose the identity of their subject and are frequently gossip pieces. Braggadocio is also a major element of the songwriting. In the song's verse, SZA communicates her desirability to men and announces "them hoe accusations weak" and "them bitch accusations true". After revealing how she embodies those traits by saying she presents an unfriendly attitude and has sex with men she calls heart throbs, she finds various ways to insult her past lovers.

SZA raps about having "your favorite rapper" blocked on social media, saying she heard a rumor that his "dick was wack". Certain athletes, who try to flirt in her messages and incessantly ask she text them back but to no avail, are other subjects whom she targets. Her lesser side, she reasons, loves to taunt people, explaining her refusal to make exceptions for any of the men she does not acknowledge. She rejects an ex-boyfriend seeking to rekindle their relationship, through the lines "he screamin', 'Gеt back together', I'm screamin', 'Back of thе bus, trick!'" The lyrics contain a comparison between SZA's former romantic partners and Sideshow Bob, a character from The Simpsons who is a clown and a criminal:

Got you talkin' crazy
Abracadabra, you niggas Sideshow
I'm Bobbin' like Psycho

== Release ==
During a Billboard cover story published in November 2022, SZA revealed that the album's release date was scheduled for sometime during the following month. She posted the album's track list on Twitter on December 5, and SOS was released four days later. Out of 23 songs, "Smoking on My Ex Pack" appears as the eleventh track. The song charted in Canada, the United States and its component Hot R&B/Hip-Hop Songs, and the Billboard Global 200 upon the album's release. (Note: See the charts section for the exact peaks.) In April 2023, it was certified platinum by the Recording Industry Association of America.

One month after the album's release, American rapper Latto performed a freestyle rap over the beat of "Smoking on My Ex Pack". SZA reacted positively; on Instagram, she wrote, "OH ITS UPPPPPP [sic]", paired with a heart emoji. The song had its live performance debut during the SOS Tour, performed while SZA went backstage for an outfit change, which the stage screen captured. (Note: Cited to Consequence, Billboard, The Boston Globe, and Exclaim!)

== Critical reception ==
Critics were positive about SZA's experimenting with rap on "Smoking on My Ex Pack", lauding it for showcasing her more confident side. They welcomed its lyrics for marking a departure from her other works, which primarily focused on angst and vulnerability, and its placement between tracks that, by contrast, focused on SZA's insecurities about her relationships. Much of the praise focused on the harshness and unfiltered nature of her songwriting. They found it clever, funny, or emotionally impactful. (Note: The Los Angeles Times's Mikael Wood commented on the song's contrast with the more vulnerable album tracks, praising the "jolt" it induces. Jerusalem Truth of NPR wrote that "cocky looks great on her"; Jason P. Frank of Vulture compared the "bitch accusations" line to scripture and was fond of the "fun, new SZA". Other relevant comments can be found in Complex and The Sydney Morning Herald.) Shaad D'Souza of The Guardian wrote: "the [SOS] lyrics that stick out to me aren't the deeply sad ones that seem to be the basis for a lot of 2am tweets and TikTok captions, but the ones that call bullshit on ideas that SZA should have to be respectable or 'real'." Other music journalists wrote that "Smoking on My Ex Pack" exemplified the album's begrudging side and was the album's "most stank-face-inducing" track. (Note: Julianne Escobedo Shepherd of Pitchfork made the first comment, and Mikael Wood of Los Angeles Times made the second.)

Another point of commentary was SZA's flow and delivery, attributes that led many critics to think her first attempts at rap music demonstrated her potential to become a good rapper. (Note: Some examples of such music journalists include ones from Exclaim!, Vulture, and Okayplayer.) In the words of The Sydney Morning Herald's Giselle Au-Nhien Nguyen: "she takes to rapping for the first time and she sounds like a natural, with impeccable flow and a healthy dose of venom." For this reason, Steffanee Wang of Nylon and Precious Fondren of HipHopDX called "Smoking on My Ex Pack" a highlight of SOS—Fondren recommended that readers play it on repeat. Some critics liked how the harsh rapping in "Smoking on My Ex Pack" juxtaposed the soft sound of the album tracks that come before it. (Note: Cited to Exclaim!, Complex, The Toronto Star, and the Associated Press) Paul Attard, Slant Magazine writer, argued that this provided the album's otherwise weak middle section some much-needed catharsis.

"Smoking on My Ex Pack", for critics Jason P. Frank of Vulture and Robyn Mowatt of Okayplayer, was a highlight of SZA's discography. Encouraging SZA to make more lyrically similar songs, Frank wrote: "in the context of her career, it's also a flex; her best is not her limit — it's the floor." In Complex, Ecleen Luzmila Caraballo listed the "Smoking on My Ex Pack" rap verse as one of the best of 2022 and wrote that SZA's usage of wordplay further strengthened her lyrics. She and Frank, however, took issue with the song's length, feeling "Smoking on My Ex Pack" did not reach its full potential due to its shortness.

== Credits ==
Adapted from the liner notes of SOS

Recording and management

- Engineered at Westlake Studio A (Los Angeles, California)
- Mixed at The Gift Shop (Los Angeles)
- Mastered at Becker Mastering (Pasadena, California)
- Contains a sample of "Open Up Your Eyes" as performed by Webster Lewis, written by Skip Scarborough and Raina Taylor, published by Warner Chappell Music, Inc. (BMI) and Raina Bundy (Raina Bundy Publishing Designee) (BMI), used courtesy of Sony Music Entertainment.

Personnel

- Solána Rowe (SZA) – vocals, songwriting
- Jahlil Gunter (Jay Versace) – songwriting, production
- Skip Scarborough – songwriting
- Raina Taylor – songwriting
- Dylan Neustadter – engineering
- Rob Bisel – engineering
- Josh Deguzman – engineering (for mix)
- Syd Tagle – assistant engineering
- Jon Castelli – mixing
- Dale Becker – mastering
- Katie Harvey – assistant mastering
- Noah McCorkle – assistant mastering

== Charts ==
Chart performance for "Smoking on My Ex Pack"
Chart (2022)	Peak position
Canada Hot 100 (Billboard)	61
Global 200 (Billboard)	71
US Billboard Hot 100	52
US Hot R&B/Hip-Hop Songs (Billboard)	23

== Certifications ==
Certifications for "Smoking on My Ex Pack"
Region	Certification	Certified units/sales
Canada (Music Canada)	Gold	40,000^{‡}
United States (RIAA)	Platinum	1,000,000^{‡}
^{‡} Sales+streaming figures based on certification alone.
