= S (EP) =

EP by SZA
- Released: April 10, 2013
- Recorded: 2013
- Genres: Alternative R&B; neo soul
- Length: 28:09
- Label: Self-released
- Producers: Zodiac; Patrick Lukens; Brandun DeShay; WNDRBRD; Waren Vaughn; Felix Snow

SZA chronology
See.SZA.Run (2012)	S (2013)	Z (2014)

Singles from S
- 1. "Ice.Moon" Released: February 22, 2013; 2. "Castles" Released: August 16, 2013

S is the second extended play by American singer-songwriter SZA; it was self-released on April 10, 2013. After meeting members of independent label Top Dawg and releasing her debut EP See.SZA.Run (2012), SZA began working on S, beginning recording in early 2013. SZA worked with a variety of producers on the album, including Zodiac, Patrick Lukens, Brandun DeShay, WNDRBRD, Waren Vaughn and Felix Snow. S is characterized as an alt-R&B album with production that "twists and mutates."

SZA promoted the mixtape with the release of a music video for the song "Ice Moon"; the video was directed by Lemar & Dauley.

== Background ==
SZA first met members of Top Dawg Entertainment during the CMJ Music Marathon in 2011, when her boyfriend's clothing company sponsored a show in which Kendrick Lamar was performing. A friend attending the show with her presented early SZA songs to TDE president Terrence "Punch" Henderson, who enjoyed the material and stayed in touch. On October 29, 2012, SZA released her debut self-released extended play entitled See.SZA.Run, which featured production from Brandun DeShay, APSuperProducer, among others. In June 2013, Top Dawg Entertainment stated plans to sign two more artists, announcing on July 14 that SZA had been signed to the label.

== Recording ==
In May 2013, SZA revealed that she had been working with producers Holy Other and Emile Haynie, the latter of whom had previously worked with Lana Del Rey and Kid Cudi. SZA met Holy Other through mutual friends. After being in the same area as one another and working in the same studio, the pair began working together. SZA met producer Felix Snow via a mutual friend and they later began "hanging out", SZA described Felix as being "completely not the textbook producer" continuing to expand on working with Felix SZA said;

If you've ever seen him he wears sunglasses inside all day and sandals all year round. He's basically always in yacht mode. He has a Tamagachi [sic] and a Giga Pet, so he's a character-and-a-half. But we're like family. I went to his house in Connecticut and played with his menagerie of animals and met his parents and ate soup.

In a June 2014 interview with the YouTube channel "Star Sessions", SZA revealed that the songs "Terror.Dome", "Castles" and "Wings" were all recorded the night before the EP was released. She additionally described that 2013 was a tough time in her life as she was going through a lot of personal changes, and when it came to music: "I was just kinda winging it, like SUPER winging it".

== Critical reception ==
Adam Kevil of Consequence of Sound gave a positive review of the EP. Praising the album's musical direction, Kevil called the work sincere and "cool", continuing on to note how SZA's courage proves "she's equally as aware of her strengths as she is the potential for constant maturation and growth".

== Track listing ==
All tracks are written by SZA.

No.	Title	Producer(s)	Length
1.	"Castles"	Felix Snow	3:02
2.	"Terror.Dome"	Waren Vaughn	4:26
3.	"Aftermath"	WNDRBRD	3:38
4.	"The Odyssey"	brandUn DeShay	3:22
5.	"Pray"	Snow	3:18
6.	"Ice.Moon"	Snow; Patrick Lukens	3:10
7.	"Wings"	Lukens	4:26
8.	"Kismet"	Zodiac	2:47
Total length:			28:09

Sample credits

- "Castles" contains samples of "Everywhere", written by Christine McVie, and performed by Fleetwood Mac.
- "Terror.Dome" and "Kismet (Outro)" contain snippets from the 1968 horror film, Rosemary's Baby.
- "The Odyssey" contains a sample of an interview with Eartha Kitt from the 1982 documentary All By Myself - The Eartha Kitt Story.

== Release history ==
Region	Date	Format	Label
United States	April 10, 2013	Digital download	Self-released

== See also ==
- Alternative R&B
