= See.SZA.Run =

EP by SZA
- Released: October 29, 2012
- Genres: Alternative R&B; neo soul
- Length: 24:08
- Producers: AP Super; Dot; Brandun DeShay; Top Notch; Hassan Insane

SZA chronology
See.SZA.Run (2012)	S (2013)

Singles from See.SZA.Run
- 1. "Time Travel Undone" Released: August 6, 2012; 2. "Country" Released: August 15, 2012

See.SZA.Run is the debut extended play (EP) by American singer-songwriter SZA, self-released on October 29, 2012. After graduating from college and postponing graduate school, in order to make money, SZA began recording music informally, and decided to continue. SZA recorded songs with her friend who lived close by, using production apps and beats from the Internet.

An alternative R&B and neo soul EP, See.SZA.Run has a diverse musical style that incorporates contemporary urban genres such as soul, hip hop, and minimalist R&B. The EP also takes influences from cloud rap and ethereal R&B and also uses witch house and chillwave elements. The production is characterized as being built over billowing synths, booming bass and crushed beats.

Upon release, the extended play was met with positive reviews. Music critics commended the album, its lyrical content and production, and some compared the album to the work of musicians including Drake, The Weeknd, Miguel and Frank Ocean. To promote the EP, on October 9, 2012, SZA released a music video for the song "Country".

== Background ==
After secondary school, Rowe attended three separate colleges; in her freshman year she "got high and failed out." Rowe went to college to study marine biology, with the intention to go to "grad school" in order to become a scientist and travel. The plan never materialized, and she began to do "random jobs" in order to make money. SZA first met members of Top Dawg Entertainment during the CMJ 2011, when her boyfriend's clothing company sponsored a show in which Kendrick Lamar was performing. A friend attending the show with her foisted early SZA songs onto TDE president Terrence "Punch" Henderson, who liked the material and stayed in touch.

SZA describes the process of recording for her EP as being "experimental", without having a larger goal in mind. SZA first began recording music informally; after recording one song she continued the process until she decided she should "make something out of it." SZA recorded the songs with her friend and neighbor; they "stole a bunch of beats off the Internet." The extended play featured production from brandUn DeShay, APSuperProducer, amongst others. Taking beats from DeShay led SZA to begin actually working with him.

== Music and lyrics ==
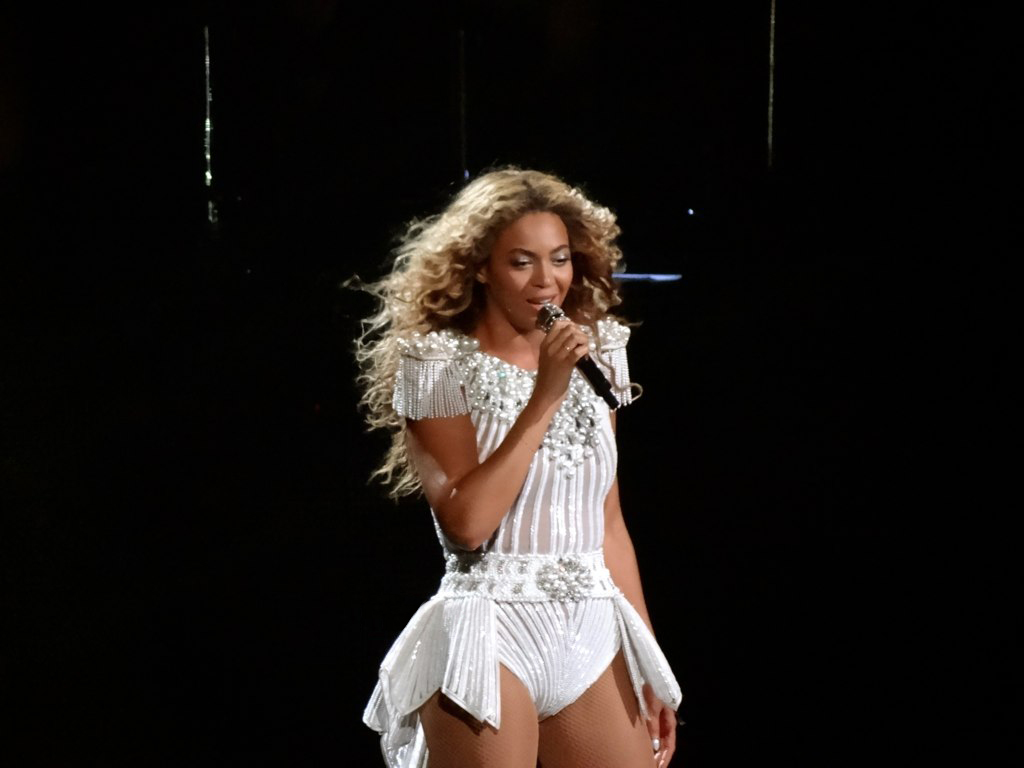
"Time Travel Undone" was described as a mixture between Björk and Beyoncé (pictured).

See.SZA.Run has a diverse musical style that incorporates contemporary urban genres such as soul, hip hop, and minimalist R&B. The EP also takes influences from cloud rap and ethereal R&B as well as using witch house and chillwave elements. The production is characterized as being built over billowing synths, booming bass and crushed beats.

The EP opens with the song "Bed," which was compared to the work of American singer Ciara. Euphraxia is a "future hip hop" song described as being a "waxing esoteric about existentialism and the like, searching for answers over a clipped clatter." "Time Travel Undone" was described as a mixture of "Björk-Beyoncé" that is musically "a new kind of avant-jazz pop: unorthodox and untrammeled, yet accessible enough for repeat plays. Her track "Country" is a blues and soul song described by The Guardian as being from "Venus and Mars."

"Crack Dreams" lyrically discusses the necessity for the titular narcotic, and is built over a "tranquilizing bleepscape" production. "Once Upon a High" closes the EP. The song was described as a "superb quality and distinction and introduces an artist with a vision singular enough to demand everyone's attention, not just those waiting for R&B to ascend to the next level."

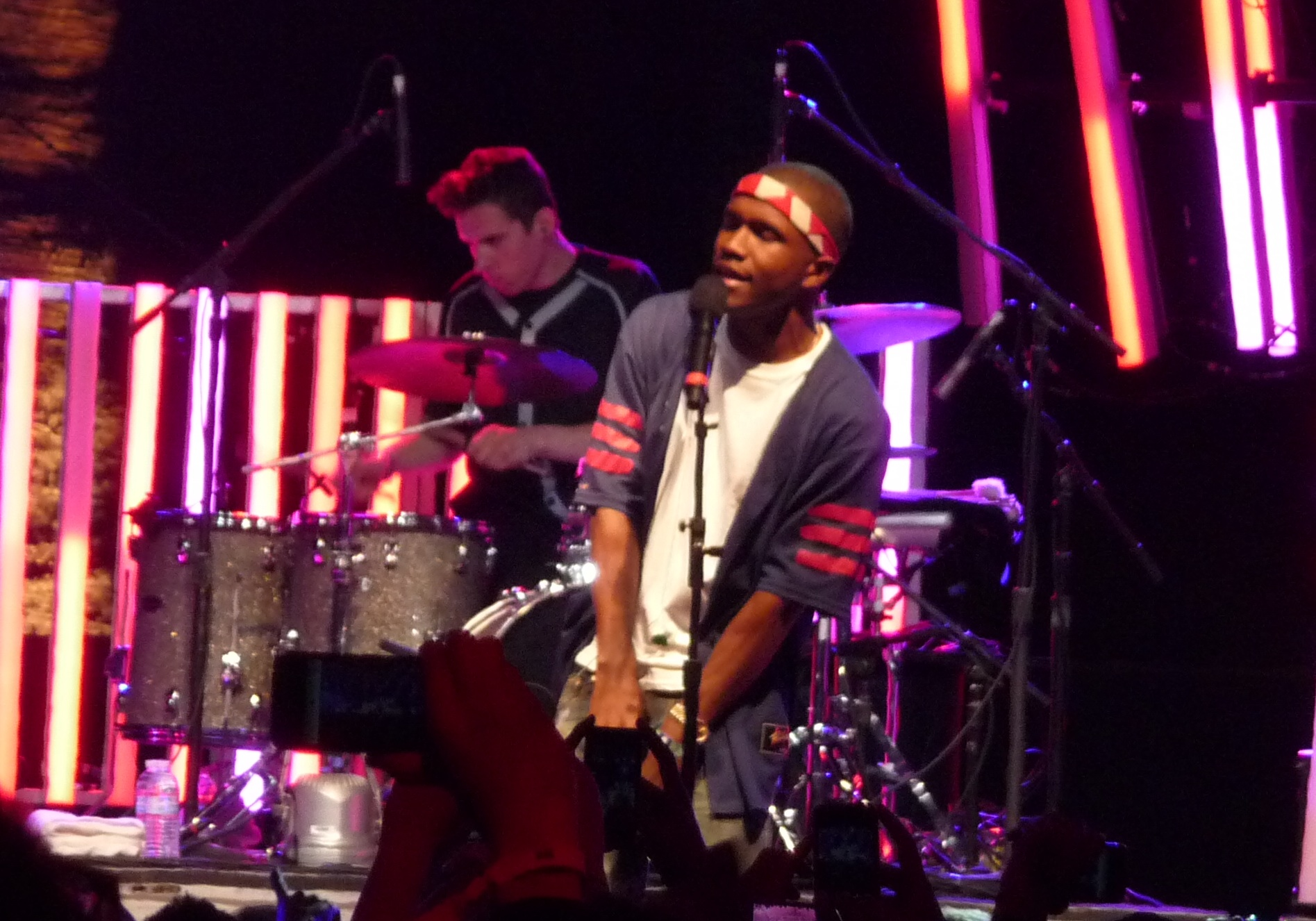
The EP was compared to the work of Frank Ocean.

== Release ==
See.SZA.Run was preceded by two 2012 singles, "Time Travel Undone" and "Country". "Time Travel Undone" was uploaded to SoundCloud on August 6, and "Country" followed nine days later.

Upon its release, the extended play was met with positive reviews from music critics. Complex commended the album, noting it for being "made for multiple listens", and praised the album's production, saying "each song flows together perfectly and succinctly". Paul Lester from The Guardian praised the album, noting similarities between SZA and Drake, The Weeknd, Miguel and Frank Ocean, calling SZA the female version of the singers. Lester also praised the album's title, names, and lyrical content calling the lyrics "inscrutable, adding to the atmosphere of pleasant torpor/stupor".

== Track listing ==
All tracks are written by SZA (Solána Rowe).

No.	Title	Producer(s)	Length
1.	"Bed"	AP Super	4:19
2.	"Euphraxia"	Dot	3:20
3.	"Advil"	brandUn DeShay	3:02
4.	"Time Travel Undone"	Top Notch	3:06
5.	"Crack Dreams"	brandUn DeShay	3:01
6.	"Country"	brandUn DeShay	4:29
7.	"Once Upon a High"	Hasan Insane	2:51
Total length:			24:08

== Personnel ==
Credits adapted from SoundCloud.

- Matthew Cody – engineered and mixed
- Kareem Blair – art design
- Jolie Sanchez – press
- AP Super – producer
- Dot – producer
- Brandun Deshay – producer
- Top Notch – producer
- Hassan Insane – producer
- Solána Rowe – vocals

== Release history ==
Region	Date	Format	Label
United States	October 29, 2012	Digital download	Self-released
