= 2018 Soul Train Music Awards =

Music awards ceremony in Las Vegas, US

Soul Train Music Awards
- Date: November 17, 2018
- Location: Orleans Arena, Las Vegas, Nevada
- Country: United States
- Hosted by: Tisha Campbell & Tichina Arnold
- Most awards: Ella Mai (3)
- Most nominations: H.E.R. (7)
- Website: www.bet.com/shows/soul-train-awards/

Television/radio coverage
- Network: BET, BET Her, VH1

The 2018 Soul Train Music Awards took place on November 17 at the Orleans Arena in Las Vegas, Nevada. The ceremony aired on BET and BET Her on November 25, and was hosted by Tisha Campbell & Tichina Arnold, honoring artists in 12 different categories. During the award ceremony soul singer Erykah Badu was honored with the Legend Award while Faith Evans received the Lady of Soul Award for her contributions to the music industry.

== Special awards ==
Honorees are as listed below:

=== Legend Award ===
- Erykah Badu

=== Lady of Soul Award ===
- Faith Evans

== Nominees ==
Nominees are as listed below. Winners are in bold:

=== Best New Artist ===
- **Daniel Caesar**
  - Jorja Smith
  - Kali Uchis
  - Leon Thomas
  - Normani
  - Queen Naija

=== Soul Train Certified Award ===
- **Ledisi**
  - Ashanti
  - Jorja Smith
  - Lenny Kravitz
  - MAJOR.
  - Tamia

=== Best R&B/Soul Female Artist ===
- **Ella Mai**
  - Beyoncé
  - H.E.R.
  - Mariah Carey
  - SZA

=== Best R&B/Soul Male Artist ===
- **Bruno Mars**
  - Childish Gambino
  - Daniel Caesar
  - John Legend
  - Khalid
  - Tank

=== Best Gospel/Inspirational Award ===
- **Lecrae**
  - Andra Day
  - Kirk Franklin
  - Snoop Dogg
  - Tori Kelly

=== Rhythm & Bars Award (Best Hip-Hop Song Of The Year) ===
- **Drake – "In My Feelings"**
  - Cardi B – "I Like It" (with Bad Bunny and J Balvin)
  - Childish Gambino – "This is America"
  - DJ Khaled – "No Brainer" (featuring Justin Bieber, Chance the Rapper and Quavo)
  - The Carters – "Apeshit"

=== Song Of The Year ===
- **Ella Mai – "Boo'd Up"**
  - Bruno Mars – "Finesse (Remix)" (featuring Cardi B)
  - H.E.R. – "Every Kind of Way"
  - SZA – "The Weekend"
  - The Internet – "Come Over"

=== Album/Mixtape Of The Year ===
- **H.E.R. – H.E.R.**
  - Chloe x Halle – The Kids Are Alright
  - Chris Brown – Heartbreak on a Full Moon
  - Leon Bridges – Good Thing
  - Miguel – War & Leisure
  - The Internet – Hive Mind

=== The Ashford And Simpson Songwriter's Award ===
- **Ella Mai – "Boo'd Up"**
  - **Written by Ella Howell, Dijon McFarlane, Joelle James & Larrance Dopson**
- Bruno Mars – "Finesse" (Remix) (featuring Cardi B)
  - Written by Gene Hernandez, Belcalis Almanzar, Christopher Brody Brown, James Fauntleroy, Philip Lawrence, Ray McCullough, Klenord Raphael, Jeremy Reeves, James Yip & Ray Romulus
- Childish Gambino – "Summertime Magic"
  - Written by Donald Glover and Ludwig Göransson
- Daniel Caesar – "Best Part" (featuring H.E.R.)
  - Written by Ashton Simmonds, Gabi Wilson, Riley Bell, Matthew Burnett, Jordan Evans
- H.E.R. – "Focus"
  - Written by Gabi Wilson, Darhyl Camper & Justin Love
- SZA – "Broken Clocks"
  - Written by Solána Rowe, Cody Fayne, Adam Feeney, Ashton Simmonds & Thomas Paxton-Beesley

=== Best Dance Performance ===
- **Ciara – "Level Up"**
  - Bruno Mars – "Finesse" (Remix) (featuring Cardi B)
  - Chris Brown – "Tempo"
  - HoodCelebrityy – "Walking Trophy"
  - Janet Jackson – "Made for Now" (featuring Daddy Yankee)

=== Best Collaboration Performance ===
- **Daniel Caesar – "Best Part" (featuring H.E.R.)**
  - Bruno Mars – "Finesse" (Remix) (featuring Cardi B)
  - John Legend – "A Good Night" (featuring BloodPop)
  - Khalid – "OTW" (featuring Ty Dolla $ign and 6lack)
  - SZA – "Doves in the Wind" (featuring Kendrick Lamar)

=== Video Of The Year ===
- **Bruno Mars – "Finesse" (Remix) (featuring Cardi B)**
  - Ella Mai – "Boo'd Up"
  - H.E.R. – "Avenue"
  - SZA – "Broken Clocks"
  - The Internet – "Come Over"

== Multiple nominations and awards ==
The following received multiple nominations:

Nominations	Recipients
7	H.E.R.
6	Bruno Mars
6	Cardi B
5	Daniel Caesar
5	SZA
4	Ella Mai
3	Childish Gambino
3	The Internet
2	Chris Brown
2	John Legend
2	Jorja Smith
2	Khalid

The following received multiple awards:

Awards	Recipients
3	Ella Mai
2	H.E.R.
2	Daniel Caesar
2	Bruno Mars
