= SOS Tour =

2023–2024 concert tour by SZA

- Tour by SZA
- Poster for first leg
- Location: Europe; North America; Oceania
- Associated album: SOS
- Start date: February 21, 2023
- End date: May 2, 2024
- No. of shows: 63
- Supporting acts: Omar Apollo; Raye; D4vd
- Box office: $113.1 million

SZA concert chronology
- Good Days Fall Tour (2021); SOS Tour (2023–2024); Grand National Tour (2025)

The SOS Tour was the third concert tour and first arena tour by American singer-songwriter SZA, in support of her second studio album, SOS (2022). It was announced on December 13, and commenced on February 21, 2023, in Columbus, Ohio. By its conclusion on May 2, 2024, in Melbourne, Australia, the SOS Tour comprised 63 shows.

Lasting for about 90 minutes, every show had a set list of over 30 songs, most of which were from SOS. Some were taken from Ctrl (2017), her debut studio album. Select shows had surprise guests who performed with SZA songs on which they had collaborated. Omar Apollo, Raye, and D4vd were the opening acts for each leg, respectively.

A nautical visual motif persisted throughout the concerts, and theatrical and cinematic influences were apparent. This was intentional; with the tour, SZA aimed for catharsis: to "pop ass and cry and give theater". There was a loose plot where a fishing trawler sailed to sea and sunk, some moments referenced the films Titanic (1997) and Kill Bill (2003–2004), and the production was inspired by Broadway and Disney films like Cinderella (1950). Stage settings included a pier, the trawler, a lighthouse, and a seabed. Every show began and ended with SZA on a diving board, recreating the SOS cover art. To start the show, she appeared to jump off the board and into the waters below her, done through pre-filmed visual effects.

== Background ==
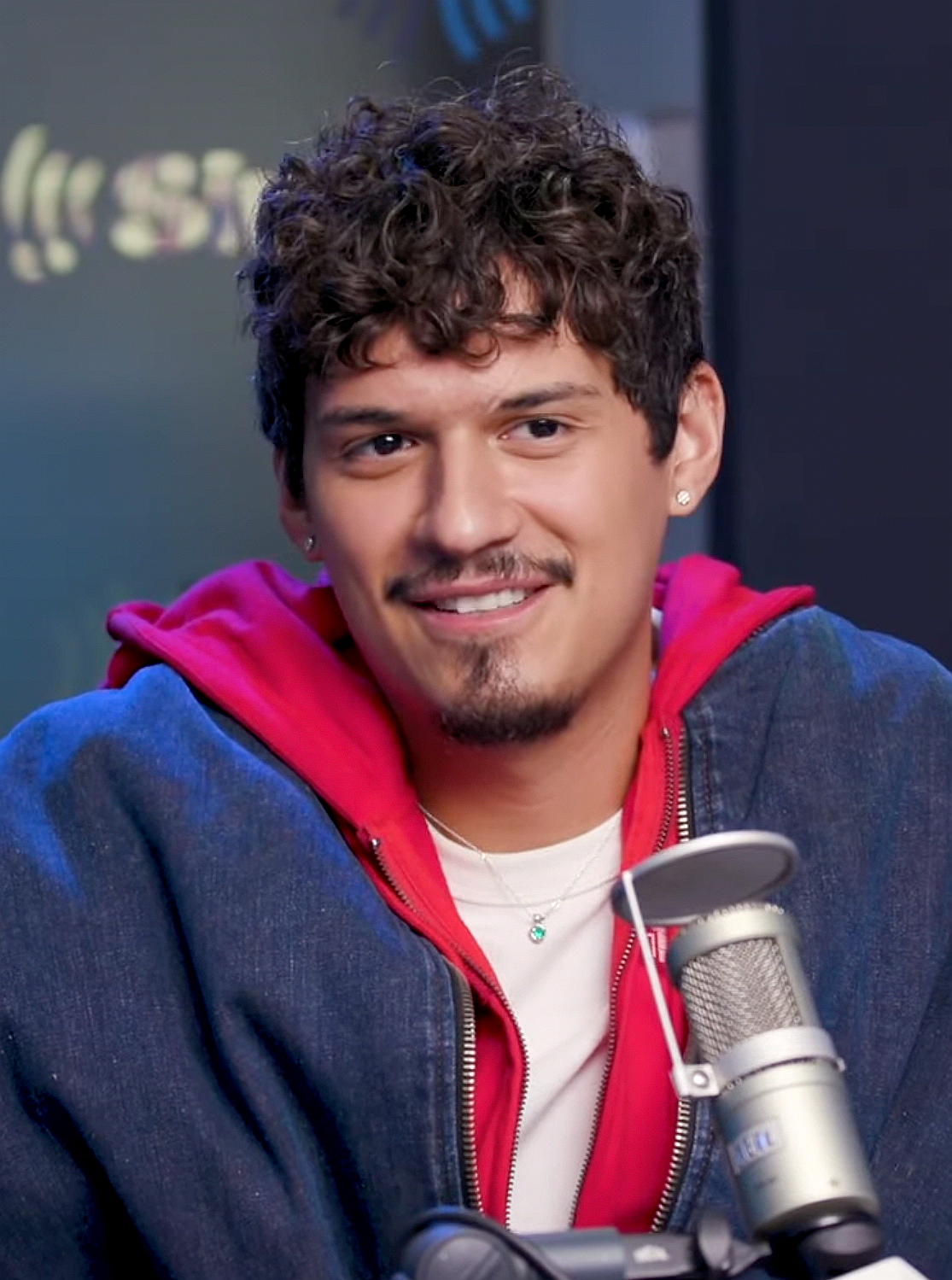
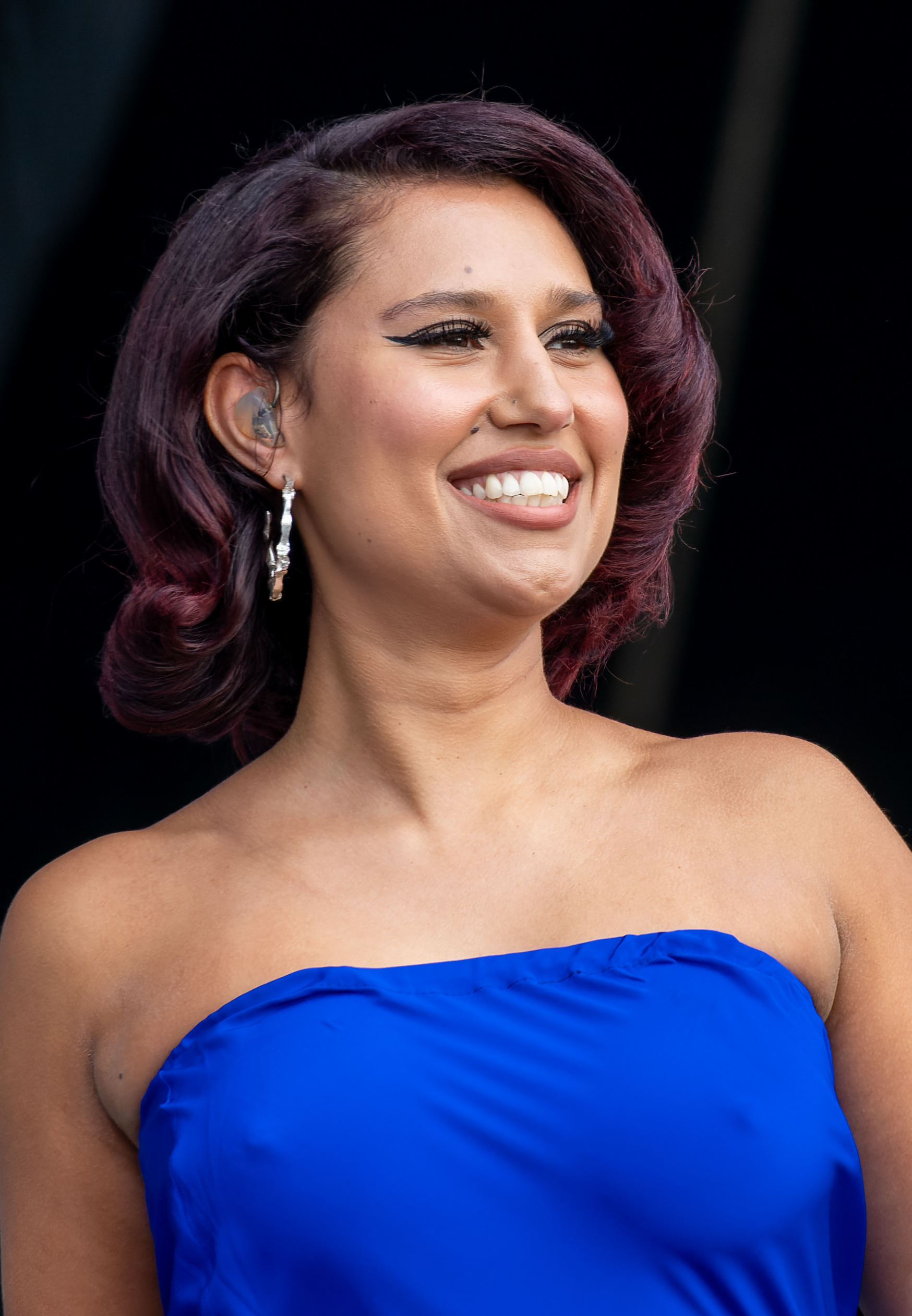
Selected to be opening acts for the tour were Omar Apollo (left) and Raye (right).

SZA's debut studio album, Ctrl, was released in 2017. Her next, SOS, was highly awaited. This was in large part due to Ctrl's critical acclaim, as well as the five-year-long wait and the several delays that occurred surrounding SOS's release. In November 2022, SZA told Billboard that the album would come out the following month. She posted the track list via Twitter on December 5, and SOS was released four days later to critical and commercial success.

In promotion of SOS, SZA announced merchandise for the album on December 13. At the same time, she revealed she would go on tour in early 2023 in support of the album. She wrote on Instagram, "Time to take this shit on the road!" Tickets went on sale via SZA's website on December 16, at 12 pm local time, with pre-sales hosted by Ticketmaster one day beforehand. Several publications called the tour one of 2023's most anticipated; some cited the critical acclaim of SOS and the years-long wait for SZA's album as reasons.

The SOS Tour is SZA's second concert tour—following Ctrl the Tour which ended in 2018—and also her first arena tour. She was set to perform only in North America, with dates in 17 cities across Canada and the United States. Omar Apollo, who never toured in arenas before, was announced as the concerts' opening act. The first concert was on February 21, 2023, in Columbus, Ohio, and the last was on March 23, 2023, in Inglewood, California. One date in Philadelphia, Pennsylvania, scheduled for March 2, was postponed.

Three weeks after the second Inglewood show, SZA announced 30 more shows for the SOS Tour due to high demand. It included a new leg in Europe, with 11 dates in seven countries. Pre-sales happened on April 12, 2023, starting 10 am local time, and an on-sale is planned for April 14 if there are leftover tickets. British singer Raye performed as the opening act in nine of the dates. After touring Europe, SZA returned to North America for 21 concerts in the United States and another concert in Canada. The set of 21 US shows includes the postponed Philadelphia date. Pre-sales are on April 13 at 10 am local time, and tickets go on sale on April 14 at 12 pm local time. In a November 2023 Variety interview with SZA for the magazine's Hitmaker of the Year award, author Jem Aswad revealed that a fourth leg set in Latin America and Oceania will take place in 2024.

== Concert synopsis ==
Water is a recurring visual motif in the concerts. During the intro, a projection of SZA as she dives into the ocean is shown on the stage screen.

The SOS Tour's concerts were around 90 minutes long, and critics divided them into four or five acts. Aesthetically, the shows had an oceanic and nautical theme. The scenery consisted of props or visual elements like aquatic animals, piers, anchors, submarines, fishing trawlers, life rafts, and lighthouses; footage of either calm or turbulent seawaters were occasionally projected onscreen. Accompanying SZA was a three-person band that flanked the stage throughout the shows. Four backup dancers were present to perform interpretative dances. At times, they were dressed as sailors.

The set lists had around 30 songs. Apart from the standard SOS tracks, SZA performed various songs from Ctrl, such as "Love Galore", "Broken Clocks", and "Garden (Say It like Dat)". She covered Erykah Badu's 2000 single "Bag Lady" and included her collaborations with other artists, such as "All the Stars" (2018) with Kendrick Lamar and "Kiss Me More" (2021) with Doja Cat. SZA also performed two then-unreleased songs—"PSA" (2025) and, in some shows, "Diamond Boy (DTM)" (2024)—during the tour. Both would later be released as part of SOS's deluxe reissue, Lana. Select concerts featured surprise guests; most were artists with whom she had worked on songs in the past.

Each concert began with a recreation of the SOS cover art—which shows SZA atop a diving board in the middle of the ocean—backed by "PSA". A cube-shaped LED screen then descended in front of her to play a pre-filmed scene. The video showed her, depicted as a silhouette, throwing her microphone at the sea and diving into the water. Emerging for "Seek & Destroy", SZA and her backup dancers appeared behind the first stage setting, a pier into which a fishing trawler is docked.

For "Shirt", visuals of puddled, gushing water followed SZA and her dancers across the stage. The subsequent costume change saw her performing "Smoking on My Ex Pack", during which a camera followed her backstage; the footage was broadcast live onscreen. Afterwards, SZA appeared on top of a life-sized sailboat beside a pier. Following a performance of her rock song "F2F", in which she and her guitarist headbanged to channel a mosh pit, the screen and stage floor projected a scene of a turbulent sea, leading her to retreat to a floating life raft. It took SZA to the opposite end of the arena, on which stood a lighthouse 20 feet (6.1 m) tall.

As the raft transported SZA across the venue, SZA performed a medley of "Supermodel" (Ctrl), "Special", "Nobody Gets Me", and "Gone Girl", throwing confetti at the crowd as she did. The storm-themed backdrop ended once she reached the other side. There, she did another costume change. She wore red biker pants and a motor suit with a spiked ball and chain in hand, recreating her outfit in the music video for "Kill Bill". Her prop was a callback to a scene in Kill Bill: Volume 1 (2003) where Gogo Yubari fought the protagonist, the Bride, at the House of Blue Leaves using a meteor hammer. The choreography and visuals themselves were based on the fight scene between the Bride and the henchmen of the antagonist O-Ren Ishii.

A bookending performance of "Good Days" marked the concert's encore. SZA concluded the show back on the diving board, as the screen projected a scene of the sun either rising or setting. In some shows, "20 Something" (Ctrl) was the final song. Home videos of her deceased grandmother, who died in 2019, played during the performance. After the concert, the screen projected an image of stars arranged to form the phrase "The End". Credits rolled, beginning with the acknowledgment of SZA as the creative director. Also included were the truck drivers, technical crew, dancers, choreographers, and backing musicians. After the credits appeared a teaser for a music video for the SOS track "Low", which depicts SZA as she uses a flamethrower.

== Aesthetic ==
=== Theater and film influences ===
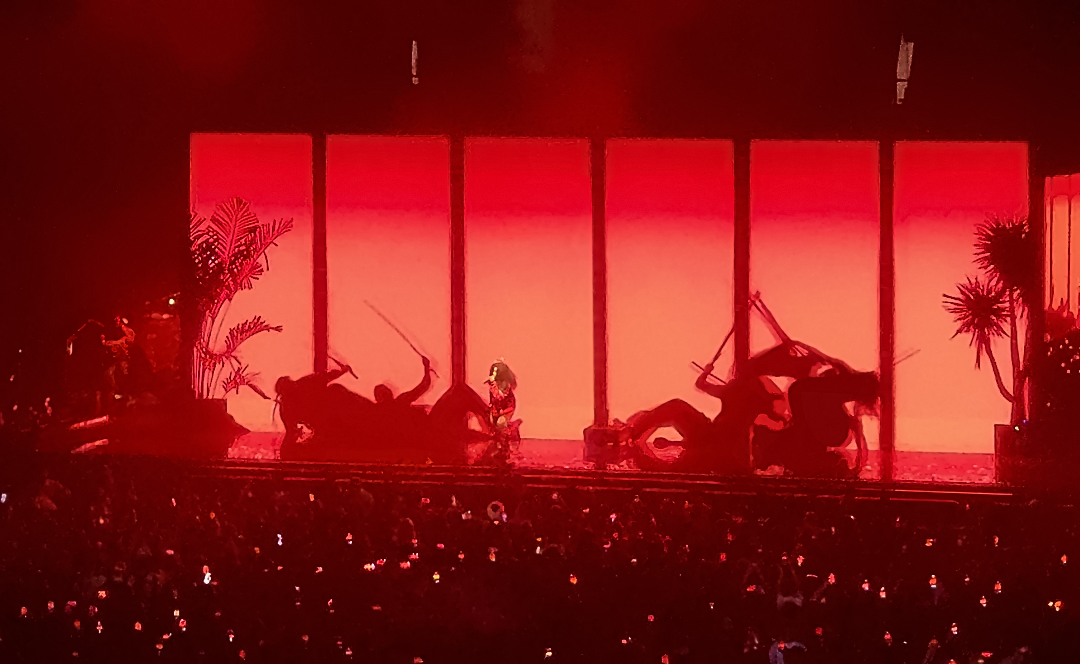
The SOS Tour visually references films such as Kill Bill (2003–2004).

SZA's approach with the tour was to "pop ass and cry and give theater", aiming for catharsis through cinematics and theatrics. She told Billboard: "I want it to be smart and exhilarating and exhausting and exciting like a party, but also like a therapy session." Broadway performances were her primary basis for the tour's production. She fused these inspirations with the visual styles of circus shows from Cirque du Soleil. Another aesthetic influence SZA cited was the film Suspiria (1977), which is dominated by vibrant, saturated colors.

The tour's cinematic and theatrical proclivities are apparent in several ways. Included are the use of credits alongside elaborate set designs and props. Bolstering the film influences are homages to Titanic (1997)—showed through the sunken-ship setting and SZA's open-arms pose at the trawler's bow—and the Kill Bill duology, showed through SZA's meteor hammer and Crazy 88 reference.

Disney films also influenced the SOS Tour's production. SZA described it as a "Cinderella moment where there's weird, ethereal, mystical, soft things" combined with a "hardcore edge", reflected through the sets and costumes. While performing the medley, SZA wore a yellow tulle gown for the shows' third outfit, reminiscent of the character Belle from Beauty and the Beast (1991). Apart from this and Cinderella (1950), the stage design and outfits took inspiration from other Disney films such as Aladdin (1992), Treasure Planet (2002) and The Little Mermaid (1989).

=== Outfits ===
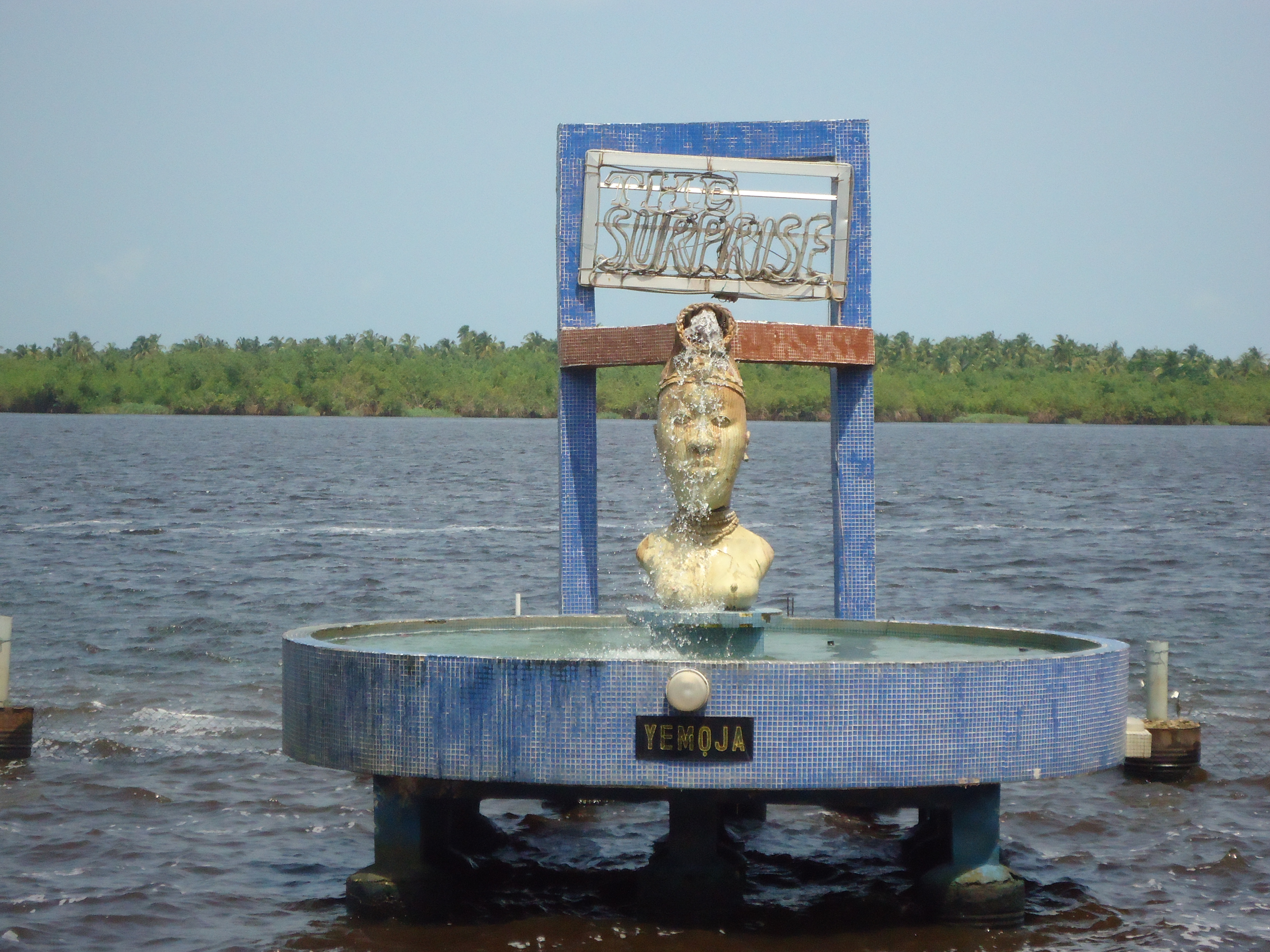
SZA wore a hockey jersey with the name "Yemaya" printed on the back. Yemaya (statue pictured) is a water spiritess of the Yoruba peoples in West Africa.

There were six wardrobe changes throughout the concerts. During the intro performance, SZA wore a variant of the St. Louis Blues hockey jersey, with its number replaced with an "S" as a callback to the SOS cover art. Printed on the back was "Yemaya", the name of a water spiritess of the West African Yoruba peoples.

Alejandra Hernandez styled SZA's garments, having collaborated since 2016 for the "Drew Barrymore" music video. Many designers contacted SZA before the tour and pitched ideas for her outfits, but she turned everyone down. Trusting Hernandez, she believed they had to "make [their] own thing". Comfort was the point behind curating SZA's looks, in two senses of the word. SZA wanted the outfits to feel comfortable, and she wanted to feel comfortable being herself.

Part of SZA's fashion sense was an affinity for oversized varsity jackets, reflected on the first costume, so Hernandez knew to always have several in their wardrobe. SZA also favored baggy men's jeans, and vintage menswear from the 1990s and early 2000s. Her clothes for many live appearances preceding the tour were frequently varsity jackets and conventional men's apparel.

It was Hernandez's first time being a stylist for arena tours. She constructed many of the garments by hand, and she ensured the designs were practical for the swift wardrobe changes. During the first dress rehearsal, however, the crew realized it was not the case. Now aware their collection was too extravagant, she and her tailor overhauled the entire wardrobe by upcycling the elaborate pieces into something simpler. They cut up many bottom wear to turn them into upper wear. She told Vogue about the third outfit: "The raft jacket she wears when she floats over the audience? That's a jacket I had to hand sew. That piece didn't exist in the wardrobe, it was gonna be worn under a skirt."

=== Analysis ===
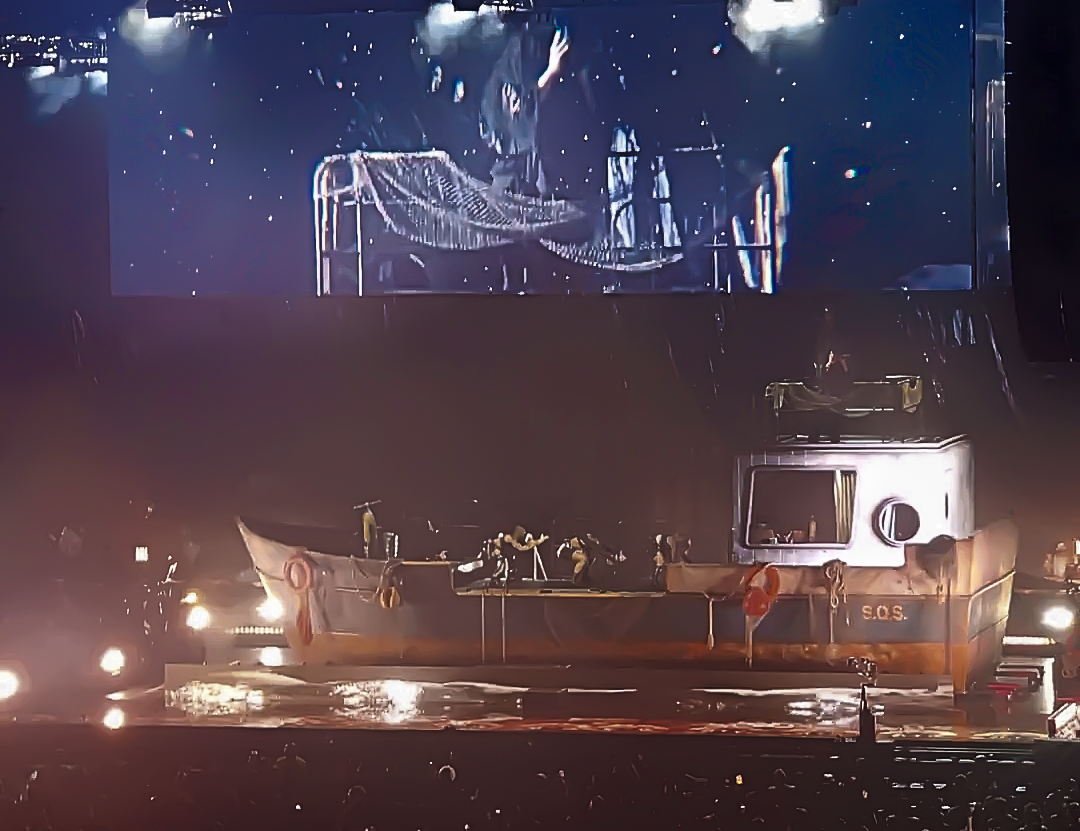
Critics interpreted the trawler's voyage as a metaphor for healing.

Critics analyzed the nautical motif as metaphors for themes frequent to SZA's music. Many of those critics wrote the tour's voyage premise, through props like the submarine and lighthouse, symbolized navigation of one's self to heal from a turbulent past. One interpretation of SZA's diving into the ocean was it was a metaphorical diving, or contemplation, into the complex variety of emotions she channeled throughout the set list. Another compared it to her willingness to take risks with romances filled with uncertainties. The ocean, according to the interpretation, represented the highs and lows of love: "SZA's voyage mirrors the turbulence and good times that can be had in any relationship. Throughout the storms and moments of confusion, love always finds its way home.

Mikael Wood of the Los Angeles Times wrote an analysis of the "Special" performance, done by the lighthouse. To contextualize, he wrote the song discusses regrets about a man who failed to appreciate the best, special version of someone. In Wood's view, the lighthouse searchlight helps the concert attendee feel seen, reflecting the vulnerable, confessional qualities of "Special" and SZA's works as a whole. He said: "She puts all the detailed complexities of a messy personal life, with its betrayals and disappointments and compromises, into a highly focused beam that somehow makes her listeners feel uniquely [acknowledged]."

== Critical reception ==
SZA's stage presence across the tour was praised in several reviews. Critics wrote that, generally, SZA was successful in exuding high confidence and charisma during performances. Some praised her conversational, confessional persona as an effective way to comfort her audience and allow them to resonate with the music. Others thought that she was able to capture the right balance of theatrics and intimacy. Some also said that SZA had no need for visually bombastic sets because her ability to connect closely with the crowd was enough to impress. Exclaim's Emilie Hanskanp wrote about the Toronto show: "for all the arena flair and pageantry [...] she delivered the palpable confessional connection that people came for. You may pay for the production, but sometimes a mic is all you need." Some critics, including Hanskamp, wrote that SZA's ability to convey wildly different emotions within the span of a few songs was evident in her vocal and dance performances. Deborah Sengupta Stith (Austin) said in a review for Austin American-Statesman: "her voice was defined by its character. Specifically, [she] has a voice that conveys pain in such a way that everyone can feel their own experience reflected back." Mikael Wood, reviewing the second Inglewood show for the Los Angeles Times, praised SZA's showcasing of her vulnerability across the concert, through lyrics that were "gloriously frank admission[s] in a night full of them".

The tour production was well-received, despite slight technical difficulties in some shows. Many critics praised the theatricality of the stage design, finding it visually striking and memorable. A concert highlight for MTV News' Mark Braboy (first Chicago stop) and The Standard's Stephen Dalton (second London stop) was the "Kill Bill" performance. The two wrote that the visuals, and choreography per Braboy's review, recreated the House of Blue Leaves fight scene faithfully. Dalton described the performance as "one of many delicious highlights in [a] hugely imaginative, ocean liner-sized show". Consequence's Abby Jones, in her review of the second New York stop, found the film-inspired production impressive enough "to give Tarantino and [David] Fincher [themselves] some ideas" for their next works. Other critics wrote that the production was able to provide engaging and immersive visual, auditory, and emotional experiences; some said the stage design was effective in that it managed to provide a sense of grand spectacle without ever distracting from the performance onstage. In his review of the Cologne show, Kölner Stadt-Anzeiger's Christian Bos said that the production succeeded in "weav[ing] ... an emotional journey" with "ample opportunity [for SZA] to focus on her vocals", without the visuals being too distracting or overwhelming. (Note: Original quotation in German: "Die aufwändige Inszenierung lenkt keineswegs von den Songs ab, im Gegenteil, sie verknüpft sie zu einer emotionalen Reise und gibt SZA reichlich Gelegenheit, sich auf ihren Gesang zu konzentrieren") Many more reviews featured similar opinions, with critics saying that the stage visuals were successfully leveraged to convey a loose albeit compelling story.

Various critics commented on the concerts' structure and pacing. Those who were complimentary found the shows cohesive and tightly focused; some thought that there were very few, if any, unnecessarily long sequences. The Mercury News' Jim Harrington (Oakland) said that every sequence in the show felt like they had a sense of purpose, and The Line of Best Fit's Mitch Stevens (first London stop) wrote that there was clear intent behind the structure and the visuals, "meticulously considered with the artist’s performance and the audience’s visceral reaction in mind". The Chicago Tribune's Bob Gendron (first Chicago stop) was complimentary about the structure, or lack thereof, believing that such an approach was effective in showcasing the versatility of SZA's music. He wrote: "In line with her eclectic music [...] SZA's deliveries refused to follow patterns or adhere to structures. Rhythmic and conversational, she changed up timing, phrasing, diction and articulation [...] Her ability to keep her word flow off-balance matched her vacillation between strength and weakness, happiness and sadness, codependence and independence." He felt less positively about the pacing, feeling that at times the segments were too rushed. Similarly critical of the pacing were Wood, Stevens, and Dalton. Dalton and Gendron wrote in their reviews that had SZA slowed down in the more rushed segments, she would have had more opportunities to connect intimately with the audience.

Other topics covered in reviews included the concerts' technical aspects. Some critics wrote positively about the "diving" scene after "PSA", finding the illusion a demonstration of technical ingenuity. A few others commented about the vocals and sound mixing. Robert van Gijssel of de Volkskrant (Amsterdam) and Eric Bureau of Le Parisien (Paris) said in their respective reviews that SZA generally was not overpowered by or overly reliant on the backing tracks. The two thought that overall, she was capable of delivering strong vocal performances, adding that the few times she fell short in this regard was during intense choreography. Sarah Jones of Rolling Stone Australia (first Auckland stop), meanwhile, wrote that the show she attended occasionally faced issues with overly loud backing tracks.

The song choices for the set list were also a point of commentary. Several critics praised them by saying that they effectively showcased the versatility of SZA's music and songwriting. Reviewing the first New York stop, The New York Times' Jon Caramanica wrote that the set was a "15-minute tour de force, spanning genres and modes", but also "utterly modern — indebted to the past but not beholden to it, unconcerned with old stylistic limitations, casually adroit." Billboard's Lyndsey Havens, who reviewed the second Inglewood stop, said the set list was the right, cohesive blend of Ctrl and SOS tracks, arranged in a way that aligns well with the story SZA aimed to convey with the tour.

== Commercial performance ==
According to Billboard, the SOS Tour finished 2023 as the year's 38th best-selling tour, grossing $57 million and attracting at least 420,000 attendees within the boxscore tracking period. In total, the tour grossed $95.5 million and sold 674,000 tickets in 2023. Billboard wrote the "slow-burning success" of Ctrl on the US albums chart was a major contributor to the tour's commercial performance. To promote the album, SZA performed in places that could accommodate around 1,000 people, a relatively low capacity, such as Brooklyn Steel in New York City. Ctrl's five-year run on the chart was a sign of anticipation for new music and thus, according to them, bolstered high demand for a tour that involved larger venues. This was the cause of the exponential rise in boxscore compared to the Ctrl Tour.

The SOS Tour's first leg sold 238,000 tickets and grossed $34.5 million, based on figures reported by Billboard. On average, each show earned $1.9 million and drew 12,812 attendees. Dispersion of tickets sold per night was low, ranging from 11,069 in Atlanta and 14,383 in Toronto. San Diego attendance was an outlier. Due to the arena's relatively small capacity, it attracted only 8,700 people. The nights that had the most attendees and biggest revenue were the back-to-back dates. The New York City and Inglewood concerts, respectively, sold 27,000 and 25,000 tickets. Grossing $4.7 million were the New York City concerts, and grossing $3.9 million were the Inglewood concerts.

At Emo's in Austin, SZA performed to an audience of 1,550, grossing $31,000. When she revisited the city and performed in the Moody Center, the show's attendance multiplied sevenfold, and she earned 55 times the 2017 show's revenue. Her back-to-back New York City shows saw 1,376% more concertgoers and at least 10,000% more gross compared to when she earned $45,000 from 1,800 attendees at the Brooklyn Steel concert.

== Accolades ==
Organization	Year	Award	Recipient(s)	Result	Ref.
Pollstar Awards	2024	Hip-Hop Tour of the Year	The SOS North American Tour	Nominated	
Pollstar Awards	2024	R&B Tour of the Year	The SOS North American Tour	Nominated	

== Set list ==
2023

This set list is from the Columbus show. It is not intended to represent all dates throughout the tour.

1. "PSA"
2. "Seek & Destroy"
3. "Notice Me"
4. "Conceited"
5. "Love Galore"
6. "Broken Clocks"
7. "Forgiveless"
8. "Used"
9. "Bag Lady" (Erykah Badu cover)
10. "Blind"
11. "Shirt"
12. "Too Late"
13. "Smoking on My Ex Pack"
14. "All the Stars"
15. "Prom"
16. "Garden (Say It like Dat)"
17. "F2F"
18. "Drew Barrymore"
19. "Doves in the Wind"
20. "Low"
21. "Open Arms"
22. "Supermodel"
23. "Special"
24. "Nobody Gets Me"
25. "Gone Girl"
26. "SOS"
27. "Kiss Me More"
28. "Love Language"
29. "Snooze"
30. "Kill Bill"
31. "I Hate U"
32. "The Weekend"

Encore

33. "Good Days"

2024

This set list is from the first Melbourne show. It is not intended to represent all dates throughout the tour.

1. "Seek & Destroy"
2. "Love Galore"
3. "Broken Clocks"
4. "Forgiveless"
5. "Ghost in the Machine"
6. "Blind"
7. "Shirt"
8. "Awkward"
9. "All the Stars"
10. "Low"
11. "Prom"
12. "Garden (Say It like Dat)"
13. "Open Arms"
14. "F2F"
15. "Drew Barrymore"
16. "Supermodel" / "Special"
17. "Nobody Gets Me"
18. "Normal Girl"
19. "Kiss Me More"
20. "Love Language"
21. "Snooze"
22. "I Hate U"
23. "Kill Bill"
24. "The Weekend"
25. "Good Days"
26. "Go Gina"

Encore

27. "20 Something"

=== Surprise guests ===
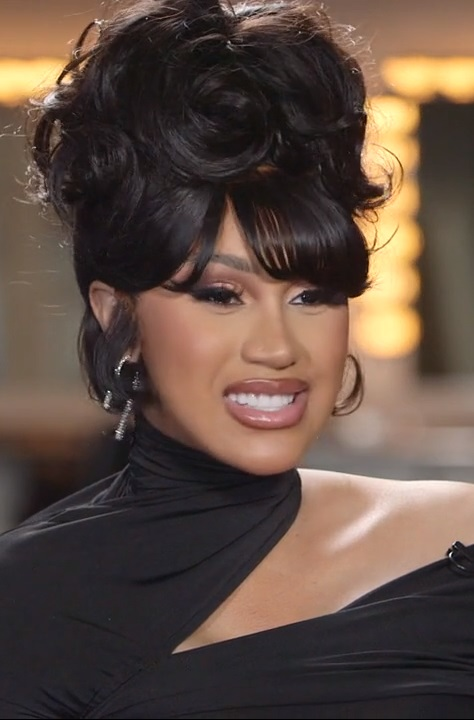
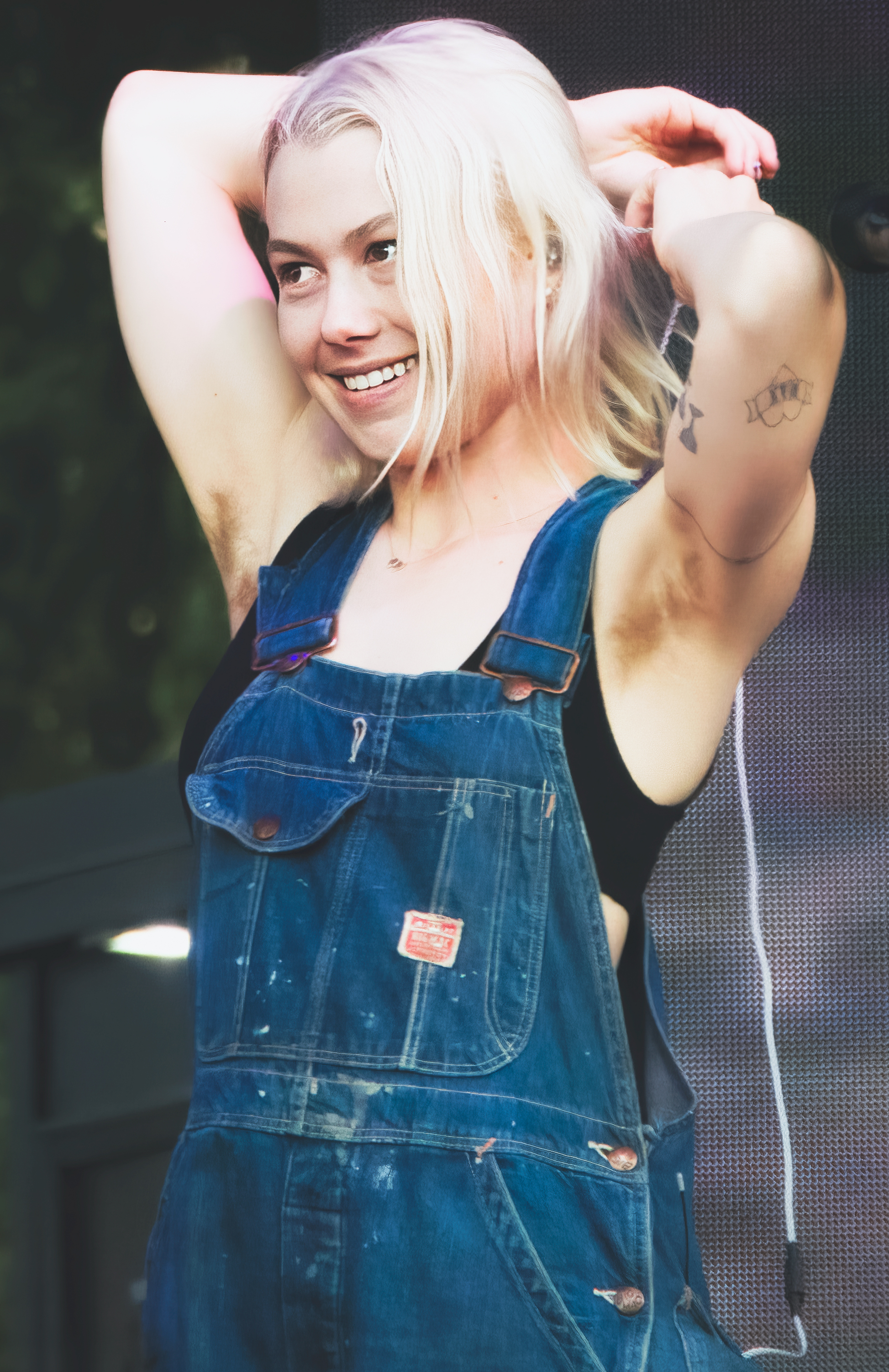
Surprise guests included Cardi B (left) and Phoebe Bridgers (right).

The following is a list of surprise special guests that accompanied SZA during the SOS Tour. A dagger indicates a collaboration between SZA and the guest.

1. Phoebe Bridgers for "Ghost in the Machine" (2022)^{†}
  - March 4, 2023 – New York City
  - March 23, 2023 – Inglewood
2. Cardi B for "I Do" (2017)^{†} and "Tomorrow 2" (2022)
  - March 4, 2023 – New York City
3. Summer Walker for "No Love" (2022)^{†}
  - March 7, 2023 – Atlanta
4. Lil Baby for "Forever" (2022)
  - March 7, 2023 – Atlanta
5. Lizzo for the "Special" remix (2023)^{†}
  - March 23, 2023 – Inglewood
6. Travis Scott for "Love Galore" (2017)^{†} and "Low" (2022)^{†}
  - June 1, 2023 – Amsterdam
  - June 13, 2023 – Manchester
  - June 17, 2023 – London
7. Sexyy Red for "Rich Baby Daddy" (2023)^{†}
  - October 11, 2023 – St. Louis
8. Aliyah's Interlude for "It Girl" (2023)
  - April 26, 2024 – Sydney

== Tour dates ==
List of concerts
Date	City	Country	Venue	Opening act
February 21, 2023	Columbus	United States	Schottestein Center	Omar Apollo
February 22, 2023	Chicago	United States	United Center	Omar Apollo
February 24, 2023	Detroit	United States	Little Caesars Arena	Omar Apollo
February 25, 2023	Toronto	Canada	Scotiabank Arena	Omar Apollo
February 27, 2023	Washington, D.C.	United States	Capital One Arena	Omar Apollo
February 28, 2023	Boston	United States	TD Garden	Omar Apollo
March 4, 2023	New York City	United States	Madison Square Garden	Omar Apollo
March 5, 2023	New York City	United States	Madison Square Garden	Omar Apollo
March 7, 2023	Atlanta	United States	State Farm Arena	Omar Apollo
March 9, 2023	Austin	United States	Moody Center	Omar Apollo
March 10, 2023	Dallas	United States	American Airlines Center	Omar Apollo
March 13, 2023	San Diego	United States	Viejas Arena	Omar Apollo
March 14, 2023	Oakland	United States	Oakland Arena	Omar Apollo
March 16, 2023	Seattle	United States	Climate Pledge Arena	Omar Apollo
March 18, 2023	Portland	United States	Moda Center	Omar Apollo
March 19, 2023	Vancouver	Canada	Rogers Arena	Omar Apollo
March 22, 2023	Inglewood (Note: Promoted as Los Angeles.)	United States	Kia Forum	Omar Apollo
March 23, 2023	Inglewood	United States	Kia Forum	Omar Apollo
June 1, 2023	Amsterdam	Netherlands	Ziggo Dome	Raye
June 3, 2023	Amsterdam	Netherlands	Ziggo Dome	Raye
June 5, 2023	Paris	France	Accor Arena	Raye
June 7, 2023	Zürich	Switzerland	Hallenstadion	Raye
June 9, 2023	Berlin	Germany	Mercedes-Benz Arena	Raye
June 11, 2023	Cologne	Germany	Lanxess Arena	—N/a (Note: Raye cancelled her appearances in Manchester and Glasgow, due to exhaustion.)
June 13, 2023	Manchester	England	AO Arena	—N/a
June 15, 2023	Glasgow	Scotland	OVO Hydro	—N/a
June 17, 2023	London	England	The O_{2} Arena	Raye
June 18, 2023	London	England	The O_{2} Arena	Raye
June 21, 2023	Dublin	Ireland	3Arena	Raye
June 22, 2023	Dublin	Ireland	3Arena	Raye
June 25, 2023	London	England	The O_{2} Arena	Raye
June 26, 2023	London	England	The O_{2} Arena	Raye
September 20, 2023	Miami	United States	Kaseya Center	D4vd
September 22, 2023	Tampa	United States	Amalie Arena	D4vd
September 24, 2023	Nashville	United States	Bridgestone Arena	D4vd
September 26, 2023 (Note: Originally scheduled for March 2, 2023.)	Philadelphia	United States	Wells Fargo Center	D4vd
September 28, 2023	Baltimore	United States	CFG Bank Arena	D4vd
September 30, 2023	Boston	United States	TD Garden	D4vd
October 1, 2023	Newark	United States	Prudential Center	D4vd
October 6, 2023	Brooklyn	United States	Barclays Center	D4vd
October 7, 2023	Brooklyn	United States	Barclays Center	D4vd
October 10, 2023	Chicago	United States	United Center	D4vd
October 11, 2023	St. Louis	United States	Enterprise Center	D4vd
October 14, 2023	Houston	United States	Toyota Center	D4vd
October 15, 2023	San Antonio	United States	Frost Bank Center	D4vd
October 18, 2023	Denver	United States	Ball Arena	D4vd
October 19, 2023	Salt Lake City	United States	Delta Center	D4vd
October 22, 2023	Los Angeles	United States	Crypto.com Arena	D4vd
October 23, 2023	Los Angeles	United States	Crypto.com Arena	D4vd
October 26, 2023	San Francisco	United States	Chase Center	D4vd
October 28, 2023	Paradise (Note: Promoted as Las Vegas.)	United States	T-Mobile Arena	D4vd
October 29, 2023	Phoenix	United States	Footprint Center	D4vd
April 13, 2024	Auckland	New Zealand	Spark Arena	Sir
April 15, 2024	Auckland	New Zealand	Spark Arena	Sir
April 16, 2024	Auckland	New Zealand	Spark Arena	Sir
April 19, 2024	Brisbane	Australia	Brisbane Entertainment Centre	Sir
April 20, 2024	Brisbane	Australia	Brisbane Entertainment Centre	Sir
April 23, 2024	Sydney	Australia	Qudos Bank Arena	Sir
April 24, 2024	Sydney	Australia	Qudos Bank Arena	Sir
April 26, 2024	Sydney	Australia	Qudos Bank Arena	Sir
April 29, 2024	Melbourne	Australia	Rod Laver Arena	Sir
April 30, 2024	Melbourne	Australia	Rod Laver Arena	Sir
May 2, 2024	Melbourne	Australia	Rod Laver Arena	Sir
Total

=== Canceled shows ===
List of canceled concerts, showing date, city, country, venue and reason for cancellation
Date	City	Country	Venue	Reason
October 4, 2023	Toronto	Canada	Scotiabank Arena	Illness

== Box office score data ==
Venue	City	Attendance	Gross
Scotiabank Arena	Toronto	14,383 / 14,383	—N/a
Madison Square Garden	New York City	26,574 / 26,574	$4,738,096
State Farm Arena	Atlanta	11,069 / 11,069	—N/a
Kia Forum	Inglewood	25,026 / 25,026	$3,862,099
Total		77,052 / 77,052 (100%)	$8,600,195
