= Garden (Say It like Dat) =

Single by SZA

from the album Ctrl
- Released: June 19, 2018
- Genre: Alternative R&B; trap
- Length: 3:28
- Label: Top Dawg; RCA
- Songwriters: Solána Rowe; Daniel Tannenbaum; Craig Balmoris
- Producer: Bēkon

SZA singles chronology
"Broken Clocks" (2018)	"Garden (Say It like Dat)" (2018)	"Power Is Power" (2019)

Music video
- "Garden (Say It like Dat)" on YouTube

"Garden (Say It like Dat)" is a song by American singer-songwriter SZA. It was released on June 19, 2018 as the fifth and final single from her debut album, Ctrl (2017). The song was serviced to Urban radios on June 19, 2018, by Top Dawg and RCA. The song was produced by Bēkon and additionally produced by Craig Balmoris.

== Music video ==
The music video was released on May 20, 2018, and was directed by Karen Evans. It showcases SZA singing in front of various landscapes with a "dreamy" atmosphere. It features scenes in a jungle where links with her lover portrayed by Childish Gambino following her cameo appearance in Childish Gambino's This Is America video. The video also features a cameo appearance by SZA's mother, Audrey Rowe who can also be heard throughout Ctrl in various discussions.

== Live performances ==
The song was included in the set list of her Ctrl the Tour and performed various times. Elsewhere, SZA performed "Garden (Say It like Dat)" during the SOS Tour (2023–2024). She has also included the song on the set list of her co-headlining Grand National Tour (2025) with rapper Kendrick Lamar. During the performance, SZA had a massive money note plastered on her back, and she was flanked by two dancers on dressed like praying mantises.

== Personnel ==
All credits adapted from Tidal, BMI and ASCAP

- Solana Imani Rowe — vocals, songwriting
- Craig Balmoris — songrwrting, production
- Daniel "Bekon" Tannenbaum — songrwrting, production, engineering
- Sergiu Adrian Gherman — songwriting
- Tyler Reese Melenbacher — songwriting
- Hector Castro — production, engineering
- Derek "MixedByAli" Ali — engineering
- The Donuts — production
- Danikeyz Productions — publishing
- Songs of Universal, INC. — publishing
- CALOWAYFROMBD — publishing
- CRAIG B OF BKS — publishing
- ONE77 SONGS — publishing

- SERGFROMBD — publishing

== Charts ==
Chart (2018)	Peak position
US Hot R&B Songs (Billboard)	20

== Certifications ==
Region	Certification	Certified units/sales
Canada (Music Canada)	Platinum	80,000^{‡}
United Kingdom (BPI)	Silver	200,000^{‡}
United States (RIAA)	3× Platinum	3,000,000^{‡}
^{‡} Sales+streaming figures based on certification alone.

== Release history ==
Region	Date	Format	Label	Ref.
United States	June 19, 2018	Urban contemporary radio	Top Dawg; RCA	
