= Doves in the Wind =

Promotional single by SZA featuring Kendrick Lamar

from the album Ctrl
- Written: 2015
- Released: June 8, 2017
- Recorded: 2015
- Studio: No Excuses (Santa Monica)
- Genre: Boom bap
- Length: 4:26
- Label: Top Dawg; RCA
- Songwriters: Solána Rowe; Cameron Osteen; Kendrick Duckworth; Reggie Noble; John Bowman; Dana Stinson; Trevor Smith; James Yancey
- Producer: Cam O'bi

Music video
- "Doves in the Wind" on YouTube

"Doves in the Wind" is a song by American singer-songwriter SZA featuring American rapper Kendrick Lamar. It was released on June 8, 2017, as a promotional single from SZA's debut studio album Ctrl (2017). The song is about female sexual empowerment; in the lyrics, SZA encourages men to see their relationships with women past their sex appeal so they can form meaningful romantic relationships. She described the song as an ode to vaginas – the word "pussy" is mentioned over 25 times – and its sound as a showcase of her more masculine side. A boom bap song, "Doves in the Wind" samples a slowed-down instrumental of "Turn Me Up Some" (2002) by Busta Rhymes, combining it with crackling drums and synthesizer chords.

Music critics wrote positively about "Doves in the Wind", saying that the collaboration between SZA and Lamar was synergistic. Retrospective rankings of their songs together placed "Doves in the Wind" within their top three; it was ranked second in HipHopDX's and third in Rap-Up's. The duo has performed the song during SZA's Ctrl the Tour (2017–2018), Coachella 2018, and their co-headlining Grand National Tour (2025).

A music video for the song premiered on April 27, 2018. Directed by Nabil Elderkin, it stars Lamar as a reclusive martial arts master and SZA as his aspiring student. After trekking a vast desert, SZA meets Lamar and is challenged to a duel, initially losing. After further training, she defeats him, learns his powers, and leaves by levitating away.

== Background ==
SZA began working on the project that would later become her debut studio album, Ctrl, in 2014. Its release date was initially scheduled for late 2015. Within that time, SZA befriended and then invited several record producers to collaborate with her. One of them was Cameron Osteen, known by his stage name Cam O'bi.

One day, during a friendly conversation, O'bi showed SZA a track he had created for an upcoming album. He gave it the working title "Take the Wheel". SZA reacted positively to the song, and she asked O'bi if she could buy it from him. He refused, saying that since he created it, it should stay with him. The interaction led to the start of their work relationship, and O'bi became the producer for a track called "Doves in the Wind".

== Music and production ==
"Doves in the Wind" is a boom bap song. SZA described the composition as an embodiment of her masculine side, envisioning an "ugly, gutter, and dirty" sound for the music.

Two samples are used in "Doves in the Wind". The first is a slowed-down version of the instrumental from "Turn Me Up Some", a 2002 song by Busta Rhymes. The sample is overlaid with loud and crackling drums combined with some synthesizer chords. O'bi told the website DJBooth.net that the drums were inspired by those on "Everybody's Something" (2013) by Chance the Rapper. The second sample is of Redman's ad libs on "Let's Get Dirty (I Can't Get in da Club)" (2001).

SZA and O'bi worked on "Doves in the Wind" in about early 2015. The first demo O'bi produced was, in his words, "pretty[-]sounding", but SZA rejected it in favor of "something a man would do". The prompt made him recall an unfinished track he made for Vic Mensa, which contained a sample of "Turn Me Up Some". He chopped and screwed this demo, and SZA liked the result. She went on a studio session an hour after O'bi finished the instrumental, writing all of her lyrics with a short turnaround time. In the same room as her was Kendrick Lamar, SZA's labelmate at the time, listening to the beat and watching her work on "Doves in the Wind". Impressed with the production and the aggressive songwriting, Lamar wrote his own verses and decided to be a guest feature on the song.

== Lyrics ==
"Doves in the Wind", according to SZA, is an ode to vaginas. The word "pussy" is mentioned over 25 times in the song; the opening line itself reads, "real niggas do not deserve pussy." The Chicago Tribune's Bob Gendron wrote that SZA's repeated use of the word "pussy" was an act of reclamation, saying that she took a vulgar term meant to insult female sexuality and transformed it into a source of liberation.

The song's main theme is women's empowerment. In the lyrics, SZA sings that there should be more to a man's relationship with a woman than sex. She urges men to prioritize romantic feelings over sexual attraction, saying they should be more like Forrest Gump, the protagonist of the eponymous 1994 film. SZA declares that for men to achieve successful relationships with women, they should see women beyond just their bodies so they can truly get to know each other. One lyric reads: "see right through walls, ain't talkin' about pussy." (Note: In an interview with The Breakfast Club, SZA explained that the "walls" in question did not refer to just her body. She mentioned "mental [and] emotional walls" as well, saying that she builds these metaphorical walls so her partner does not have to manage her personal issues for her.) As an insult to her more sex-obsessed love interests, SZA tells them that their penises are incapable of providing pleasure, easily replaceable by sex toys like dildos.

In his verse, Lamar criticizes men who become so overwhelmed by their desire for sex that they are willing to kill or die for it. He calls out their intense boldness to pursue women sexually, saying that they do not even have anything meaningful to provide a woman in a relationship. According to NPR's Brandi Fullwood and Paste's Nastia Voynovskaya, Lamar's critiques of sex obsession are, to a lesser extent, also aimed at some women.

== Release and reception ==
"Doves in the Wind" was released via SoundCloud on June 8, 2017 – hours before Ctrl – as a promotional single from the album. In the US, it peaked at numbers 12 on Billboard's Bubbling Under Hot 100 chart, 2 on Bubbling Under R&B/Hip-Hop Songs, and 13 on Hot R&B Songs. It also peaked at number 6 on the New Zealand Heatseekers chart. The song has been certified double platinum in the US, platinum in Canada, and silver in the UK.

Music critics wrote positively about "Doves in the Wind", saying that the collaboration between SZA and Lamar was synergistic. Vibe's Clarissa Brooks and The Irish Times's Jim Carroll wrote that even though Lamar had a tendency to "dominate" the songs he featured in, he gave SZA the necessary space for them to leave an equal amount of impact. Tara Joshi of The Observer had similar thoughts. She wrote in her review of Ctrl, "[t]he presence of big names like [...] Lamar is exciting, but ultimately they're just complementing SZA's moment". Other points of praise included Lamar's verse itself, which The AV Club's Clayton Purdom said was one of his best post-Damn (released April 2017). Voynovskaya and Uproxx's Brandon Caldwell found SZA's blunt songwriting humorous, independently quoting the lyric "highkey, your dick is weak, buddy". Voynovskaya likened the amusement she felt while listening to the thrill of being in a "slumber party with your best girlfriends".

Throughout the years, Lamar became known as SZA's most prolific collaborator. Many listicles have therefore been published ranking the songs they had made together. "Doves in the Wind" was ranked as their second-best collaboration by HipHopDX's; Rap-Up placed it at number three. Malcolm Trapp, for the latter publication, highlighted the extremely profane lyrics as part of the song's appeal. He said: "It's not [...] radio-ready, which probably makes it even more of a guilty pleasure." "Doves in the Wind" also ranked third on Collider's list, which was compiled by Alex Gonzalez. He praised it as a Ctrl standout due to its theme of female empowerment, aggressive songwriting, and "top-tier storytelling".

== Music video ==
A music video for "Doves in the Wind", directed by Nabil Elderkin, premiered on April 27, 2018. It features several tropes and stereotypes characteristic of vintage martial arts films. An Uproxx article by Derrick Rossignol described the video as a "kung fu parody", citing the use of "poorly overdubbed dialogue [and] cheesy sound effects". A journalist at Ebony wrote the video may be influenced by the 2000 wuxia film Crouching Tiger, Hidden Dragon. Lamar and SZA portray, respectively, a reclusive martial arts teacher who can levitate and a woman who seeks to be his protégé. (Note: Lamar plays the role in his alter ego Kung Fu Kenny.)

The video begins with SZA trekking a vast desert on horseback in search of Lamar's home. Watching from afar, he tries to stop her arrival by shooting her with blowgun darts. She dodges his attacks and successfully climbs the mountain where he lives. There, Lamar greets her as he sips from a cup of tea, sitting mid-air with his legs crossed. They agree to talk over some tea, and their conversation is dubbed with martial arts film–style dialogue.

Once their conversation ends, Lamar challenges SZA to a duel. She undergoes an initial test of skill, winning a fight against a few ninjas. However, when she faces Lamar, she is overpowered and fails to defeat him. He tells her that she fights well, though her style is "no match" for his. Motivated by the loss, SZA continues to train with Lamar in hopes of proving herself. After further training, she finally bests him in combat. Having learned his talents and his magical powers, she leaves him by levitating away from his mountain.

== Live performances ==
SZA performed "Doves in the Wind" during her international Ctrl the Tour (2017–2018). For the September 26, 2017, show in Los Angeles, she brought Lamar as a surprise guest to duet the song. The following year, the two performed "Doves in the Wind" again for SZA's set at Coachella 2018. The song was also included on the set list of the 2025 Grand National Tour, which the two headlined together. The concerts were divided into nine acts, two of which involved a shared set where Lamar and SZA duetted their collaborations. The set lists for the SOS Tour (2023–2024) also included "Doves in the Wind", although SZA performed it on her own.

== Accolades ==
List of awards and nominations received by "Doves in the Wind"
Year	Award	Category	Result	Ref.
2018	Soul Train Music Awards	Best Collaboration	Nominated	

== Credits ==
Adapted from the liner notes of Ctrl:

=== Recording and management ===
- Recorded at No Excuses (Santa Monica)
- Kendrick Lamar's vocals recorded at No Excuses
- Mastered at Bernie Grundman Mastering (Los Angeles)

=== Personnel ===
- Solána Rowe (SZA) – vocals, songwriting
- Cameron Osteen (Cam O'bi) – songwriting, production
- Kendrick Duckworth (Kendrick Lamar) – songwriting
- Reggie Noble (Redman) – songwriting
- John Bowman (DJ Kool) – songwriting
- Dana Stinson – songwriting
- Trevor Smith (Busta Rhymes) – songwriting
- James Yancey (J Dilla) – songwriting
- Norma Rowe (Granny) – skit
- Prophit – engineering
- Matt Schaeffer – vocal recording (for Scott)
- Derek "MixedbyAli" Ali – mixing
- Mike Bozzi – mastering

== Charts ==
Chart performance for "Doves in the Wind"
Chart (2017)	Peak position
New Zealand Heatseekers (RMNZ)	6
US Bubbling Under Hot 100 (Billboard)	12
US Bubbling Under R&B/Hip-Hop Songs (Billboard)	2
US Hot R&B Songs (Billboard)	13

== Certifications ==
Certifications for "Doves in the Wind"
Region	Certification	Certified units/sales
Canada (Music Canada)	Platinum	80,000^{‡}
New Zealand (RMNZ)	Platinum	30,000^{‡}
United Kingdom (BPI)	Silver	200,000^{‡}
United States (RIAA)	2× Platinum	2,000,000^{‡}
^{‡} Sales+streaming figures based on certification alone.
