= The Weekend (SZA song) =

2017 single by SZA

Single by SZA

from the album Ctrl
- Released: September 26, 2017
- Recorded: Platinum Sounds (New York City)
- Genre: R&B; neo soul
- Length: 4:32
- Label: Top Dawg; RCA
- Songwriters: Solána Rowe; Cody Fayne; Justin Timberlake; Timothy Mosley; Floyd Hills
- Producer: ThankGod4Cody

SZA singles chronology
"Homemade Dynamite" (Remix) (2017)	"The Weekend" (2017)	"All the Stars" (2018)

Music video
- "The Weekend" on YouTube

"The Weekend" is a song by American singer-songwriter SZA from her debut studio album, Ctrl (2017). It was written by SZA and its producer ThankGod4Cody. The song samples "Set the Mood (Prelude)" from Justin Timberlake's FutureSex/LoveSounds (2006), written by Timberlake, Timbaland, and Danja, who also received writing credits for "The Weekend". "The Weekend" is an R&B and neo soul record that uses a synth-line, hi-hats, drums, a high-pitched vocal sample and clocking key thumps. SZA sings about knowingly being her partner's mistress, comparing herself to the weekend.

Prior to its official release, "The Weekend" debuted on some Billboard charts. The unexpected popularity of the song prompted RCA Records to release it on September 26, 2017, as the album's second radio single. The song reached number 29 on Billboard Hot 100, becoming SZA's first and highest chart position with a solo song until the releases of "I Hate U" and "Kill Bill", which reached numbers seven and one. It also topped the Hot R&B Songs chart and was certified triple platinum by the Recording Industry Association of America (RIAA) on March 1, 2018. "The Weekend" received a Grammy nomination at the 60th Annual Grammy Awards.

Its accompanying music video, directed by American musician Solange Knowles, was released on December 22, 2017. To promote "The Weekend", SZA performed the song on Saturday Night Live and at the 2017 BET Awards. SZA also performed the song during her first headlining concert tour, "CTRL". A remixed version of the song by Calvin Harris was released on December 15, 2017, subtitled "Funk Wav Remix".

== Background and production ==
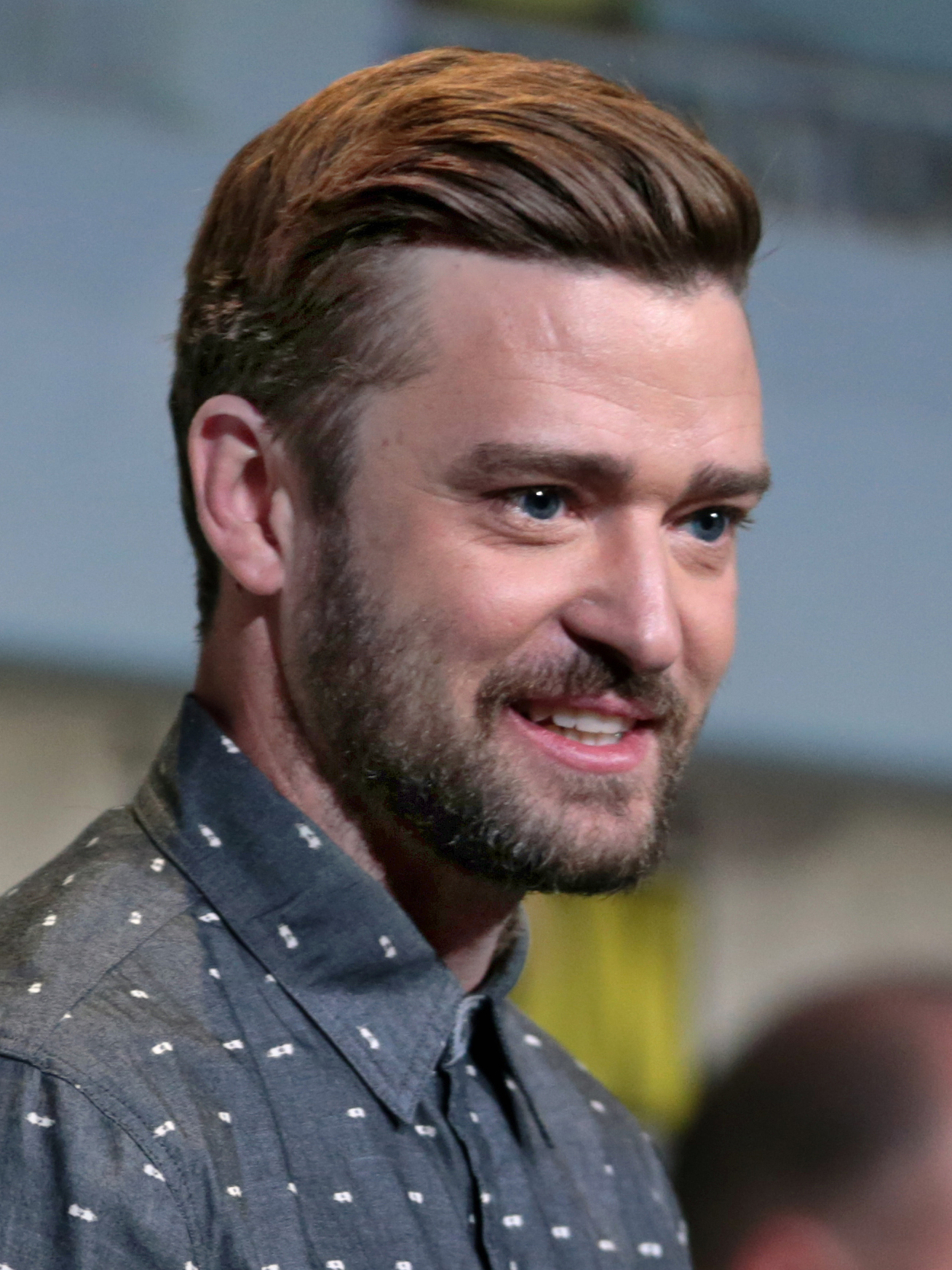
"The Weekend" samples "Set the Mood (Prelude)" from Justin Timberlake's 2006 album FutureSex/LoveSounds.

Producer ThankGod4Cody was given the idea to sample Justin Timberlake's "Set the Mood (Prelude)" (2006) by script. After being handed the sample, ThankGod4Cody added some chords, a "glittery layer" and bass. He then presented the initial production to SZA, who enjoyed the sample. SZA wrote the lyrics in a few hours the following day, and shared the results with ThankGod4Cody, who was surprised by the lyrics about sharing a man in a relationship. After experimenting with the track's instrumental, ThankGod4Cody clipped the vocals from the sample, moved them to the beginning of the song, added drums and reverberation, and finally placed the song's snares, hi-hats, and a cymbal.

SZA's vocals were recorded at Platinum Sounds Studios in New York City. The song was mixed by Derek Ali, and later mastered by Mike Bozzi at Bernie Grundman Mastering. In the U.S., "The Weekend" was sent to urban and rhythmic contemporary radio stations on September 26 and October 31, 2017, respectively.

== Music and lyrics ==
"The Weekend" is a song characterized by a soft, slow-burning melody that runs throughout its four minutes and thirty-two seconds. Its sultry production draws from contemporary R&B and 1990s neo soul music genres. Built around a synth-line, the song is completed with finger-snaps, key thumps that resemble the sound of a ticking clock, hi-hats and a high-pitched vocal sample. Lyrically, "The Weekend" is about polyamory. SZA sings about sharing her romantic partner with other women; she finds herself in the perspective of a woman who only sees her partner at weekends while others have him during the week. Some online publications called the song's narrator a "side chick", but according to SZA, "The Weekend" is about sharing a man with two other women at the same time. She sings in the hook, "My man is my man is your man / Heard it's her man too". For her, this song is about feeling empowered in a situation in which the narrator's lover tries to play her. In interview with Vulture she said:

So in this song, I'm opting in. Like, I know you have a bunch of girls, probably. Maybe you're not being honest with me—I just know that you have mad girls—and I still don't care, because I didn't want to be your girlfriend anyway! I'm not internalizing the way that you're acting as a disrespect towards me, it doesn't make me any less because you're not my boyfriend. And like, you're not her boyfriend, and you're not her boyfriend. You're just out here wildin'.

The song's producer Thank4GodCody considered its concept "crazy"; speaking to Genius he said: "I would have never thought it would have went [sic] that way. She really just did her thing on there, really came with a concept that's controversial on some levels. It's cool, because at least it's starting a conversation, and it's getting people's attention." Pitchfork's Claire Lovenfeld wrote that SZA performs the song with "a tone of both freedom and a muted sadness over settling". Jessica McKinney of Vibe viewed its lyrical content as a "not-so-typical message of women empowerment", and said that instead of giving control to her lover, SZA is "forging a deal with the other woman that (hopefully) works for both of them". A Billboard editor observed that in "The Weekend", SZA "finds herself as falling into sidepiece behavior". As the song advances, its original instrumental disappears and it becomes more uptempo where she sings, "bright ideas, we got bright ideas" over a thumbing percussion and backing chants. According to the sheet music published at Musicnotes.com by Alfred Publishing Co., Inc., "The Weekend" is written in the key of B major and is played in a "laid back" groove of 102 beats per minute. SZA's vocals range from the note of F♯_{3} to G_{5}. It follows the chord progression of Bmaj7–Amaj7–Dmaj7–Cmaj7 in the verses and G♯7–G7♭5 during the chorus.

== Reception and accolades ==
Upon its release, "The Weekend" received critical acclaim from music critics. Gerrick D. Kennedy from Los Angeles Times described it as the "standout jam" of the record. James Milton of NME appreciated its "glossy introspection" while Karas Lamb from Consequence of Sound observed that by "The Weekend" and "Go Gina"—another track from Ctrl—SZA's affection for the "slow-burning body roll classics popularized by artists like Guy and Keith Sweat and perfected by R. Kelly is pretty clear". New York Daily News's editor Amy Rowe listed "The Weekend" and "Love Galore" as the catchiest songs of the album. Writing for Complex, Karazza Sanchez praised the sample used in the song, saying it sounds "faintly like a classic Brandy single". Echoing the sentiment of Kennedy from Los Angeles Times, Aaron Williams of Uproxx called "The Weekend" a "sexy, slow-burner" and "a clear standout from ... Ctrl". Naasambala who writes for Crack Magazine highlighted "The Weekend" along with "Supermodel" and "Normal Girl", saying the candour with which SZA lays "her cards on the table" through these track "touched nerves beyond her core fans, in a time of political uncertainty and doublespeak". Similarly, a Rap-Up editor called it one of the moments where SZA resonates with listeners through her "deeply personal songwriting".

The song's lyrical content drew attention from some critics. In their list of "Best Albums of 2017", Rolling Stone magazine placed Ctrl as the 20th best album of that year and called "The Weekend" a "side-chick manifesto". SZA expressed her displeasure about the commentary via social media, writing that she does not make "side-chick anthems" and that she had already explained the song's subject. Matt F. from HotNewHipHop was defensive about SZA's songwriting, saying her lyrics "carry with them more than a small hint of being someone's back-up plan". The subject also generated public debate on the internet; Celie Almeida of Miami New Times said questions such as "Has SZA fallen prey to the insecure side-chick mentality? Or does her agency transform this message into one of empowerment and control?" became a topic of conversation. Almeida recognized SZA appeared to be "less concerned with judgment calls than painting an honest portrait of her inner life, and that honesty has made her music accessible to listeners". Billboard's Christopher Malone said SZA "expresses her disregard for men who play with her and empowers women who are strong enough to cast them aside". For NPR's Jenny Gathright, "The Weekend" is an example of a moment in the album in which SZA "hasn't taken a super defined moral stance" still "feels like self-care to me". Mathys Rennela from Drowned in Sound reflected about it saying:

The much talked about "The Weekend", in which she discusses being the other woman and being cool with it, is particularly within the context of a year marked by a strong advocacy for (sex-positive) feminism, and echoes to black female-led TV shows such as HBO's Insecure and Netflix's She's Gotta Have It which portray self-care and self-determination as acts of rebellion, telling young women that their lives can be messy, and that there's nothing wrong with that.

On the Village Voice's annual Pazz & Jop year-end songs list, "The Weekend" was tied at number 36 with six other songs. Sidney Madden of NPR considered it the ninth best song of 2017, praising its sample, and commenting, "Offering something of an olive branch to her perceived rival, SZA courageously flips the negative connotation that comes with being the other woman on its head". Meskin Fekadu of The Advocate was extremely positive, considering it the best song of 2017, saying, "SZA paints the picture vividly with her crisp vocals matched to a smooth beat". He described the song as "storytelling, creative, realistic and addictive". Pitchfork ranked it as the 22nd best song of the year, while Complex placed it 45th. Billboard ranked the song as the 77th best of 2017 and the fifth in their R&B category. In a 2025 ranking of SZA's discography, The Guardian critic Alexis Petridis rated "The Weekend" as her third-best song and was similarly positive for the Calvin Harris remix, praising both versions' sounds.

"The Weekend" was nominated for Best R&B Performance at the 60th Grammy Awards held on January 28, 2018, but lost to Bruno Mars' "That's What I Like" (2017).

== Chart performance ==
Despite not being released as a single at the time, "The Weekend" debuted at number 12 on Billboard's Hot R&B Songs chart issued for July 1, 2017. It remained on the chart until debuting on the Billboard Hot 100 five weeks later at number 89, earning SZA her second entry on the chart and the first as a solo artist. The song progressively climbed on both charts. and additionally entered the Hot R&B/Hip-Hop Airplay and Rhythmic charts following its release on radio stations in the United States. On the Billboard Hot 100 chart issued for October 7, 2017, SZA had four simultaneous entries charting at the same time: "The Weekend" at number 52, "Love Galore" at number 33, "What Lovers Do" with Maroon 5 at number 23, and "Homemade Dynamite" with Lorde, Khalid and Post Malone at number 92. For Gary Suarez of Forbes, with this accomplishment SZA "cement[ed] her star status". As of November 8, 2017, the song surpassed the mark of one million units sold in the United States, receiving a platinum certification from the Recording Industry Association of America (RIAA). On the week of January 4, 2018, "The Weekend" reached number one on the Hot R&B Songs chart, giving SZA her first number one and making her the first woman to top the ranking since Rihanna's "Needed Me" in October 2016. "The Weekend" also went on to reach its peak position at number 29 on the Hot 100. SZA's appearance as a guest performer during Saturday Night Live on December 9, 2017 also contributed to the song's increase in sales, as reported by Billboard's Trevor Anderson.

== Music video ==
=== Synopsis and conception ===
In the music video, SZA is seen moving her arm back through her head; behind her, there are some subtitles in yellow: "an imbalance of power, shifted out the whole tide"

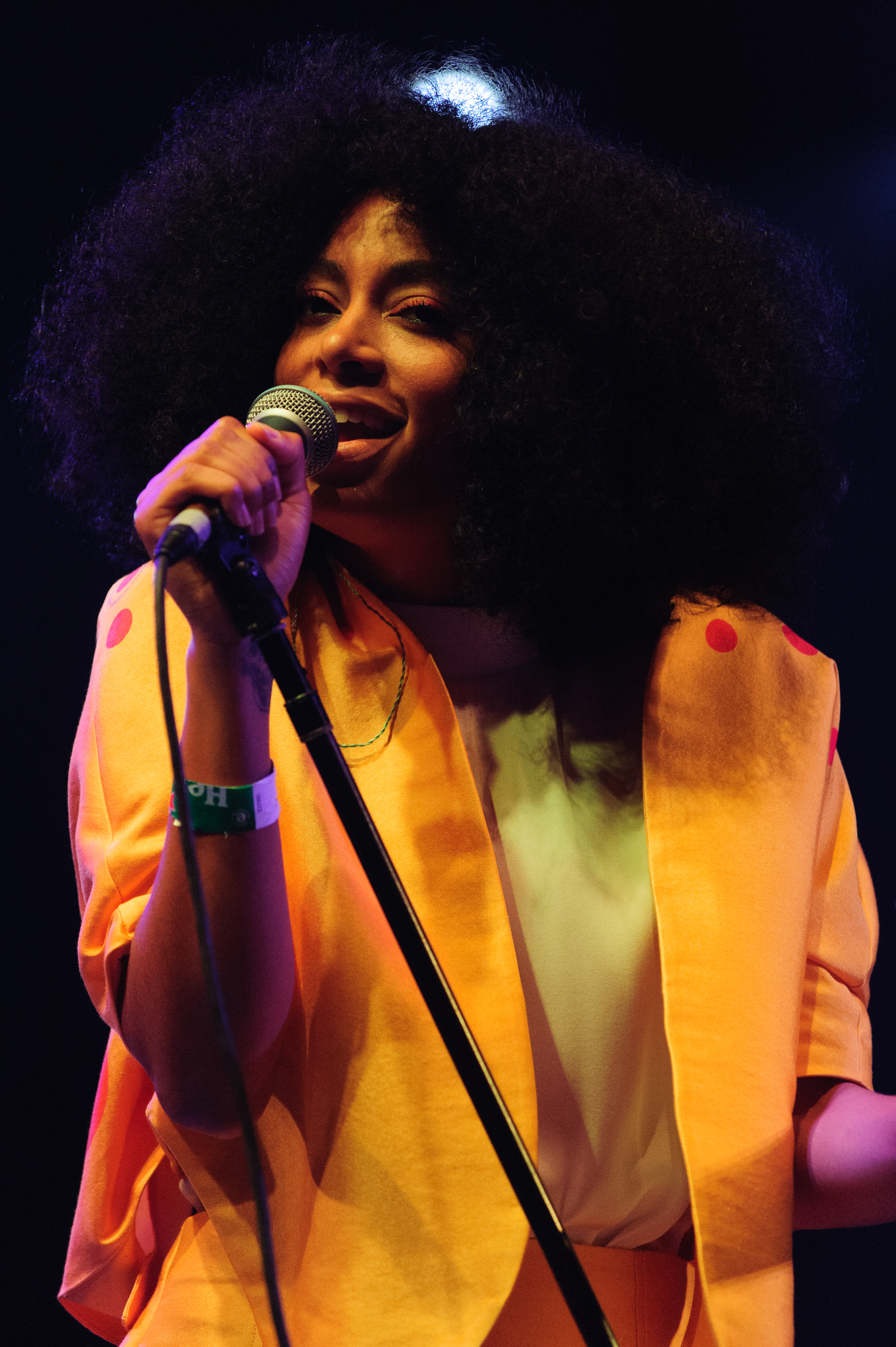
American singer Solange Knowles (pictured in 2014) directed the music video for "The Weekend"

The accompanying music video for "The Weekend" was directed by American singer-songwriter Solange Knowles and was shot in August 2017. SZA teased the video for the first time during an interview with USA Today where she also concerned her chemistry with Knowles, revealing that they had met personally a year prior to the video's shoot and they were excited about working together: "I love her. I think the universe is just bringing us closer to each other. That's my homegirl." For the video, they had originally shot in ten different locations with a specified design for each location, however, only four were included in the final version of the video. It was released on December 22, 2017.

The video opens with repetitive scenes of SZA moving her arm back through her head, behind her image, there are some subtitles in yellow: "One opted out, an imbalance of power, shifted out the whole tide, it waved and waved." SZA then appears in a dark blue, strappy leotard on the balcony of a modern building. As the video progresses, she is seen dancing alone in a parking lot wearing yellow transparent clothing. During the second verse of the song, she is in an empty art studio surrounded by red and blue glasses and light sheets covering the scenery. She also appears in an empty garden in a checkered leotard. The video ends with SZA in a stairwell, wearing a nude bodysuit, and the same subtitles from the beginning of the video are shown.

=== Reception ===
Lars Gotrich from NPR compared the song to the visuals of the video commenting that although in the song, "SZA is the other woman taking power from the man who cheats," in the video, "she takes space to dance alone, with her own power." Kevin Goddard from HotNewHipHop described the video as an "artistic and beautiful 4-minute clip find[ing] the TDE songstress showing off her seductive and elegant figure." Harper's Bazaar's Erica Gonzales appreciated SZA's looks stating that the "wardrobe choices carry hints of the artist's aesthetic, but mixed in with SZA's seductive personal style." Writing for Vulture, Hunter Harris observed that "The Weekend" video goes for something "abstract", concluding that it "isn't a side-chick anthem; SZA is reclaiming her time, and Solange has stepped in with the best visual representation of it." Anna Gaca of Spin was as positive as the other editors, she viewed the video as "super-stylish and strikingly contemporary," and further wrote that it is shot in a "cinematic widescreen that showcases the grand yet minimal backdrops." Applauding the video's "soft appeal", Andrew Roberts from Uproxx felt that it "blows the intentionally risque clips put out by Nicki Minaj and other artists away." For him, the visuals present in the work "captures all the sensuality and sexuality without hitting you over the head with it."

However, the video also received criticism due its simple aesthetic, with negative commentaries from some publications and especially from the public whose anticipations for the video were high. Bianca Grace from Fuse website for example, noted the video's resemblance to that of Solange Knowles's "Cranes in the Sky" (2016) describing it as a "watered-down version" of the mentioned song's music video. She continued by writing, "it's quite disappointing when the accompanying video doesn't share the same thrills as the tune, which is about women time-sharing the same man. Rather than laying out a storyline that could've been soap opera-worthy (in the most artful way possible), it plays more like a visual slow dance." Idolator's Mike Nied ranked the video as the 15th worst of 2017, opining that it lacks the "striking visuals" that made "Love Galore" "a stand-out". Instead, "it is a literal snooze-fest filled with basic glamour poses." Gabriela Tully Claymore agreed with a commentary made by one YouTube user who states that SZA "look[s] ready for a zombie apocalypse".

== Covers ==
On August 3, 2017, R&B singer Miguel posted a video of him singing an a capella version of the song on his Instagram page. On the caption he wrote, "Foxy-ass song, definitely a favorite of mine on the album".

American singer Khalid sung a medley of "The Weekend" and "Love Galore" accompanied by the melody played on an acoustic guitar in a tempo faster than the original version. The singer filmed a video and published it on his Twitter account; it instantaneously went viral through the internet. Jessica McKinney for Vibe called the cover "expressive" while Stereogum's Chris DeVille said Khalid gave a "characteristically rich reading of SZA's source material". American rapper Wale released a remix of the song written from a male perspective, serving as a response to SZA's original version. He opens his version with a spoken poem before singing the verses. In the remix, he admits his unfaithfulness and explains his cheating ways, rapping, "Maybe cheaters is sociopaths / Maybe we be cheatin', we ain't heal from a ho in the past / Or maybe I'm a ho and I can show you this hole in my heart / I eat your liquid gold and go home to Golden Corral, you don't know". Aron A. of HotNewHipHop praised Wale's honest lyrics, noting that he "dives deep on the song as he owns up to his infidelity and questions why he does it". "The Weekend" also gained another male perspective from rapper Maino, who responds to SZA's lyrics in his rap-sing verses about the privacy he needs with women. Writing for Uproxx, Aaron Williams recognized the song's impact while acclaiming Khalid's cover; he wrote, "It's been interesting to note that SZA's ostensibly female-empowering CTRL has resonated so strongly among male artists, but that's good music for you. It doesn't matter who you are, where you are, or why, sometimes you just have to sing."

== Live performances ==
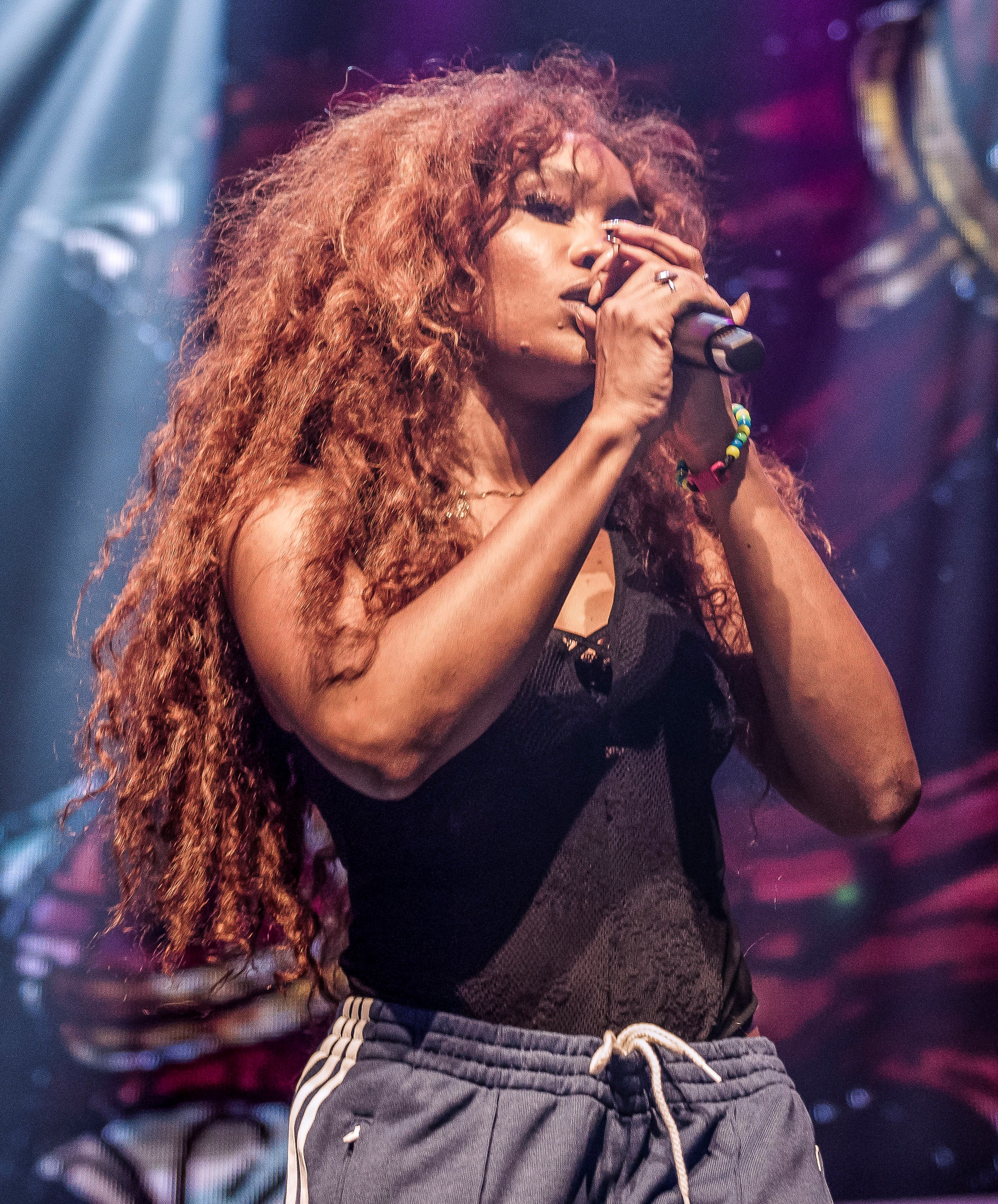
SZA performing "The Weekend" during her Ctrl the tour in Toronto, Ontario, Canada in August 2017.

SZA first promoted "The Weekend" at the 2017 BET Awards on June 25, 2017, in front of a grassy backdrop that Billboard's Lindsey Havens noted for being reminiscent of the cover artwork of Ctrl. Before SZA started singing, the performance was interrupted by unexpected technical difficulties but her performance was immediately restarted. SZA also performed the song during the 2017 Day N Night Festival that took place from September 8 to 10, 2017, at the Angel Stadium in Anaheim, California. On December 9, 2017, SZA appeared on the 43rd season of Saturday Night Live as the second artist from her label following Kendrick Lamar—who had performed a week before—on the program. She was introduced by host James Franco and performed "The Weekend" backed by a full-female choir, using sultry flute, clarinet and a trumpet as instrumentation. The set included piles of flickering televisions and computer monitors, resembling the cover artwork of Ctrl.

Entertainment Weekly's David Canfield called her performances "powerful" and said SZA brought a different vibe to her first presence at the night show combining her signature vocals with some "soothing, unique instrumental choices". Daniel Kreps of Rolling Stone applauded her vocal performance and praised the choir's presence during the performance and stating that the backing singers gave the rendition an "ethereal tone". Clash's editor Robin Murray expressed his enthusiasm by calling SZA's performance "emphatic" and "breathtaking".

Elsewhere, SZA performed "The Weekend" during the SOS Tour (2023–2024). She has also included the song on the set list of her co-headlining Grand National Tour (2025) with Kendrick Lamar.

== Credits and personnel ==
Credits adapted from the liner notes of Ctrl.

Publishing

- W.B.M Music Corporation (SESAC) and Daniah Andz Muzic (SESAC). All rights administered by W.B.M Music Publishing Corp./Universal Music – Z Tunes LLC / o/b/o Tennman Tunes (ASCAP)/OLE Virginia Beach Music (ASCAP).

Recording

- Recorded at Platinum Sounds Studios, New York City, New York.
- Mixed at Larrabee Studios, Universal City, California
- Mastered at Bernie Grundman Mastering, Los Angeles, California.

Personnel

- Songwriting – Solána Rowe, Justin Timberlake, Cody Fayne, Timothy Mosley, Floyd Hills (Note: "The Weekend" samples "Set the Mood (Prelude)" from the album FutureSex/LoveSounds by Justin Timberlake.)
- Production – ThankGod4Cody
- Vocal production – ThankGod4Cody
- Vocal recording – SZA
- Mastering – Mike Bozzi
- Mixing – Derek "Mixedbyali" Ali
- Engineering – Chris Classick

== Charts ==
=== Weekly charts ===
Weekly chart performance
Chart (2017–2018)	Peak position
Australia (ARIA)	49
Canada Hot 100 (Billboard)	63
Ireland (IRMA)	73
Portugal (AFP)	86
Scottish Singles Sales (Official Charts)	79
UK Hip Hop/R&B (Official Charts)	33
UK Singles (Official Charts)	55
US Billboard Hot 100	29
US Hot R&B/Hip-Hop Songs (Billboard)	13
US R&B/Hip-Hop Airplay (Billboard)	6
US Rhythmic Airplay (Billboard)	16

=== Year-end charts ===
Annual chart rankings
Chart (2017)	Position
US Hot R&B Songs (Billboard)	17
US Hot R&B/Hip-Hop Songs (Billboard)	54

Chart (2018)	Position
US Hot R&B Songs (Billboard)	22
US Hot R&B/Hip-Hop Songs (Billboard)	85
US R&B/Hip-Hop Airplay (Billboard)	48
US Streaming Songs (Billboard)	75

== Certifications ==
Region	Certification	Certified units/sales
Australia (ARIA)	2× Platinum	140,000^{‡}
Brazil (Pro-Música Brasil)	Platinum	60,000^{‡}
Canada (Music Canada)	5× Platinum	400,000^{‡}
France (SNEP)	Gold	100,000^{‡}
New Zealand (RMNZ)	5× Platinum	150,000^{‡}
United Kingdom (BPI)	2× Platinum	1,200,000^{‡}
United States (RIAA)	7× Platinum	7,000,000^{‡}
^{‡} Sales+streaming figures based on certification alone.

== Release history ==
Country	Date	Format	Label	Ref.
United States	September 26, 2017	Urban contemporary radio	Top Dawg; RCA	
United States	October 31, 2017	Rhythmic contemporary radio	Top Dawg; RCA	
United Kingdom	December 1, 2017	Urban contemporary radio	Top Dawg; RCA	

== Calvin Harris remix ==
"The Weekend" (Funk Wav Remix)

Single by SZA and Calvin Harris
- Released: December 15, 2017
- Genre: Funk; house
- Length: 2:51
- Songwriters: Solána Rowe; Cody Fayne; Justin Timberlake; Timothy Mosley; Floyd Hills
- Producers: Calvin Harris; ThankGod4Cody

Calvin Harris singles chronology
"Faking It" (2017)	"The Weekend" (Funk Wav Remix) (2017)	"Nuh Ready Nuh Ready" (2018)

On December 15, 2017, a remix by Scottish producer Calvin Harris subtitled "Funk Wav Remix" was released for digital download and on streaming platforms. On January 6, 2018, it impacted adult contemporary radio stations in the United Kingdom. This remix is used as an intro to the weekend version of Good Morning Football on NFL Network.

=== Background and composition ===
Kat Bein of Billboard noted SZA's "immaculate vocal" swings with "serious attitude" over the song's "sex-time synths." Rose Lilah of HotNewHipHop had a similar notion, writing that Harris added "a bit of grooviness and funk to the record", creating a "more bouncy song" than the original song which for her, has a "sombre tone."

The remix turned the song into a funk production with influences of old-school house music as noted by a Rap-Up's writer. Harris also added piano chords and a "toe-tapping slap" bass, Kat Bein from Billboard observed that Harris produced the remix on the same "'70s poolside vibe" present on his Funk Wav Bounces Vol. 1 (2017) album which draws from a throwback sound reminiscent of funk, disco musical styles.

=== Chart performance ===
The remix peaked at number 36 on the Belgium Urban Ultratop Flanders and RMNZ's New Zealand Heatseekers chart, peaking at number 3.

=== Track listing ===
Digital download – Funk Wav remix
No.	Title	Length
1.	"The Weekend (Funk Wav Remix)" (with Calvin Harris)	2:51

=== Charts ===
Chart (2017–18)	Peak position
Belgium Urban (Ultratop Flanders)	36
New Zealand Heatseekers (RMNZ)	3

=== Certifications ===
Region	Certification	Certified units/sales
Denmark (IFPI Danmark)	Platinum	90,000^{‡}
New Zealand (RMNZ)	Gold	15,000^{‡}
United States (RIAA)	Platinum	1,000,000^{‡}
^{‡} Sales+streaming figures based on certification alone.

=== Release history ===
Region	Date	Format	Label	Ref.
Various	December 15, 2017	Digital download; streaming	Top Dawg; RCA	(Note: On December 15, 2017, a remix for the single was made available worldwide.)
United Kingdom	January 6, 2018	Hot adult contemporary radio	Top Dawg; RCA	
