= Ctrl (SZA album) =

2017 studio album by SZA

Studio album by SZA
- Released: June 9, 2017
- Recorded: 2014–2017
- Studios: No Excuses; The Lake House in Michigan; EngineEars; Platinum Sounds; Top Dawg House of Pain; Josef Leimberg's studios; Windmark; 1500 or Nothin' Studios
- Genres: Alternative R&B; neo soul
- Length: 49:01
- Labels: TDE; RCA
- Producers: The Antydote; Bēkon; Craig Balmoris; The Donuts; Ging; Hector Castro; Cam O'bi; LoveDragon; Prophit; Carter Lang; Josef Leimberg; Tyler, the Creator; Scum; ThankGod4Cody; Michael Uzowuru

SZA chronology
Z (2014)	Ctrl (2017)	SOS (2022)

Deluxe cover

Singles from Ctrl
- 1. "Drew Barrymore" Released: January 13, 2017; 2. "Love Galore" Released: April 28, 2017; 3. "The Weekend" Released: September 26, 2017; 4. "Broken Clocks" Released: January 9, 2018; 5. "Garden (Say It like Dat)" Released: June 19, 2018

Ctrl (pronounced Control) is the debut studio album by American singer-songwriter SZA. It was released on June 9, 2017, by Top Dawg Entertainment (TDE) and RCA Records. The album features guest appearances from Travis Scott, Kendrick Lamar, James Fauntleroy, and Isaiah Rashad. Production was handled by Craig Balmoris, Frank Dukes, Carter Lang, Scum, and ThankGod4Cody, among others. The album was supported by five singles: "Drew Barrymore", "Love Galore", "The Weekend", "Broken Clocks", and "Garden (Say It like Dat)", all of which are certified Double Platinum or higher by the Recording Industry Association of America (RIAA).

Upon release, Ctrl was a massive critical and commercial success, and catapulted SZA into stardom. The album received acclaim from music critics, many of whom praised its cohesiveness and production, as well as SZA's vocal delivery. The album debuted at number 3 on the US Billboard 200, moving 60,000 equivalent-album units in its first week. The album and its songs were nominated for four Grammy Awards, while SZA was nominated for Best New Artist. It was also included in several year-end best music lists by publications. The album was ranked at 472 on Rolling Stone's 500 Greatest Albums of All Time list.

== Background ==
After meeting members of Top Dawg Entertainment (TDE) during the CMJ 2011, a friend attending the show with her foisted early SZA songs onto TDE president Terrence "Punch" Henderson, who liked the material and stayed in touch. Two years later, in June 2013, Top Dawg Entertainment announced they were planning to sign two more artists. On July 14, it was revealed Top Dawg had signed an upcoming female singer named SZA to the label; through this deal, SZA released Z (2014). Following the release of Z, SZA began working on her debut album and writing for other artists including Beyoncé and Nicki Minaj, and Anti's opening track "Consideration" for Rihanna, which she featured on. The debut album faced various setbacks, initially promised at the end of 2015, then at the start of 2016. In October 2016, she criticized her label for the delays and stated she would be quitting.

SZA revealed that her debut would be similar to S (2013) and would include trap influences with more aggressive lyrics, she also announced that she began working with James Fauntleroy, Hit-Boy, and long time collaborator Felix Snow. Speaking on the conception of the album, SZA stated that she had spent four years just doing music: "I've been burying friends, burying family members, burying weight, the way I feel about myself, the way I feel about God, the way I process information." The album was also inspired by SZA's view of control in her life. Speaking on this she stated "Ctrl is a concept. I've lacked control my whole life and I think I've craved it my whole life." The album was originally titled A.

== Writing and recording ==
The album's sessions began in 2014 and took place at the TDE Red Room in Carson, California. The album's recording process was described as being analog and featured the unplugging and re-plugging of wires in order to create the desired sound. During the album's studio sessions, SZA and the album's producers would go into the studio, and filter through the recorded songs and beats to decide if the songs were good or worth experimenting with in order to make better. SZA would search songs that were in the top 40 charts during various years including the 1940s and 1980s, she would then listen to their style, beats and synths to gain some inspiration. Throughout the album's recording process, record producer Rick Rubin helped SZA's creative process. "I had this mentality that 'more is more' -- more reverb, more background [vocals]," stating "I played him a bunch of songs, and he would tell me, 'The more you take away from any piece, the more room you create for everything else to be beautiful and grow.' I never felt that before, the editing urge. Once you strip everything down, you're forced to say something."

In 2015, SZA was introduced to Carter Lang by Peter Cottontale in Chicago. After performing together at Lollapalooza that same year, SZA and Lang along with producer Tyron "Scum" Donaldson began to develop a rapport on the road to creating her debut album. The three held studio sessions across the country from Los Angeles to Chicago and even setting up shop in Carter's Michigan home in 2016, where they constructed the Travis Scott-assisted "Love Galore" in Lang's mom's office using studio equipment he brought there. Lang, Tyran Donaldson, ThankGod4Cody and other producers would challenge each other and send each other different music to work on. SZA would then listen the music and want to create from that. During the producers' competition of who could create the better song, they collectively created "Broken Clocks". "Drew Barrymore" was conceived at Lang's studio in Chicago in 2016. Lang ended up notching production credits on eight tracks from the album.

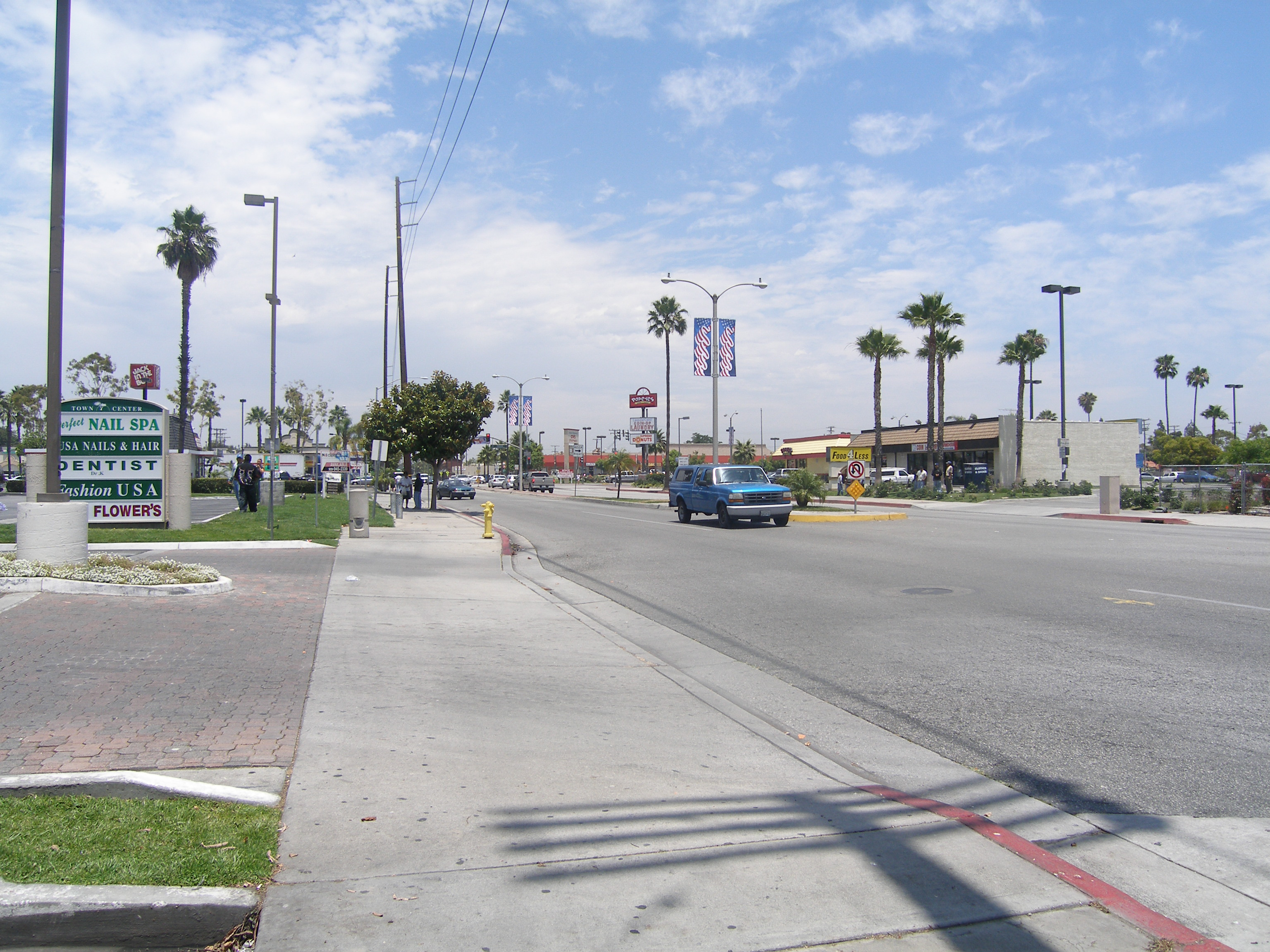
The album was recorded in Carson, California.

SZA contributed heavily to the album's lyrics, co-writing all fourteen tracks. SZA would freestyle the songs in a hope to "let the moments happen in the studio." Initially she tried to record phone notes and write down ideas in journals in order to help her write. SZA's record label TDE confiscated her hard drive during the album's recording, because SZA could not decide on the songs she wanted on the finished album, from the 150 – 200 she recorded. She also detailed how her anxiety issues affected her songwriting process: "I freestyle everything, all the way down. And I listen back and think, what’s shitty? And if something’s too shitty and I can’t put my finger on it, and I think, wow this sucks to me, then I get way frustrated, and usually scrap the song." When recording the album, SZA would record from drafts of paper, recording one draft all the way down, before listening back and rephrasing it. However, with the album's opening track "Supermodel", SZA took on a different approach, stating, "Normally if I hear a beat, I hear an idea unfold. I see where it could go. But when I heard "Supermodel," I couldn't even imagine what the song would sound like. I just wanted. I just wanted to sing. I wanted to think."

SZA recorded "Drew Barrymore" after hearing a production that reminded her of the film Poison Ivy, noting the emotion Ivy felt in the film was something SZA connected with, stating her character was "lashing out because she was lonely and pissed that her life was like this". "The Weekend" was produced by ThankGod4Cody, who had the idea to sample "Set the Mood (Prelude)/Until the End of Time" from a member of his team. After being handed the sample he added chords, a "glittery layer", and bass. After some experimentation with the vocals from the sample, the drums, and some additions in the reverb, he placed the song's snares and hi-hats, and rounded it all out with a cymbal, as he told Genius. The production was made with SZA in mind. SZA said about the sample in an interview with Associated Press: "I didn't even think about anything I was saying. I was just happy to be singing over that Justin Timberlake sample... I was just like, ‘This is for fun. This is crazy."

== Composition ==
Ctrl is primarily an alternative R&B and neo soul album, with elements of hip hop, pop, soul, electronic, and indie. Originally scheduled for release in late 2015, it was delayed by SZA's experience of "a kind of blinding paralysis brought on by anxiety." She reworked the album until her record company took away her hard drive in the spring of 2017. The album tests the borders of traditional R&B, drawing influences from trap and indie rock. The album contains a precise sonic methodology, with a fluent production, containing influences from pop, hip-hop and electronic genres. These influences were compared to a mixture of different artists' work, including Sade, Lauryn Hill, Purity Ring, Yuki, Björk, Arca and Billie Holiday. The production was characterised as predominantly hip-hop-influenced with hints of soul and pop. The album has a confessional theme, which touch upon SZA's personal experiences of love. The album's lyrical content was seen as being "frank" and was noted as an insight into the complexities of modern love; of how desire, competition, jealousy, sexual politics, social media and low self-esteem can derail a relationship. Claire Lobenfeld of Pitchfork described the album's lyrics as being "honest" and "often comically blunt". SZA's vocals were noted for containing echoes that were achieved by turning down the reverb; this was done to give the album an "intimate, confessional tone".

The album opens with "Supermodel", which is built over an electric guitar riff, and reads as an "exposed diary entry" that lyrically talks about relationship betrayal and fallout. The song talks about SZA's ex-partner who left her on Valentine's Day. Speaking about "Love Galore", which features Travis Scott, SZA touched on working with him: "I think he merges that super-fine line between melody and syncopation and pocket. And I love his pockets, and I love his note choice. He's just gnarly. He's perfect." "Doves in the Wind" features rapper Kendrick Lamar and is built over a "woozy" production. The song's themes revolves around sexual freedom, yet still having a hunger for intimacy. "Doves in the Wind" makes a reference to Forrest Gump, describing the character as the kind of man who sees women as more than sexual objects. "Drew Barrymore" is a "sluggish" R&B song with introspective lyrics, whilst "Prom" is a pop song, that was noted for being built over muted guitars which were compared to those of the Police, whilst the lyrics discuss teen angst. "The Weekend" features writing from Justin Timberlake, Timbaland, and Danja, who were credited as the song samples "Set the Mood (Prelude)/Until the End of Time" from the 2006 album FutureSex/LoveSounds. "The Weekend" is an R&B and neo soul track. Although some publications call the song's narrator a "side chick", SZA sings from the perspective of a woman who only sees her partner on the weekend, while other girls have him during the week. "Go Gina" is a reference to Tisha Campbell's role of Gina on the '90s sitcom Martin. Lyrically, the song reflects on an environment that dislikes determined women, the song goes on to discuss how people try to simplify her problems in a self-serving way. "Broken Clocks" enfolds SZA amid blurry keyboard tones and a watery sample of men's voices as she ponders memories of an old romance that still haunts her." Joshua Espinoza of Complex regarded the song as "a mid-tempo cut about optimism and perseverance".

== Release and promotion ==
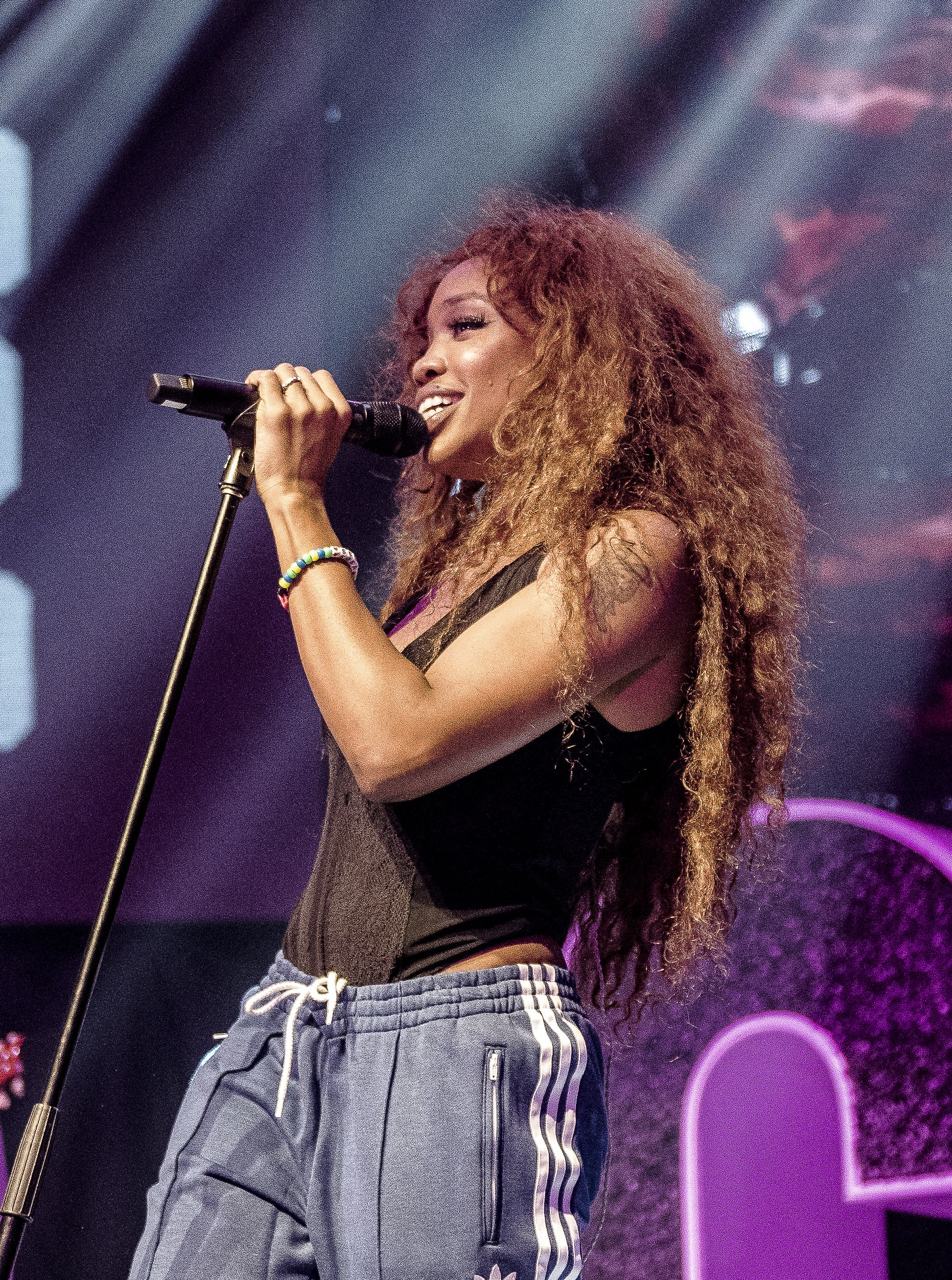
SZA performing in Toronto, Canada on the Ctrl the Tour in August 2017.

SZA premiered "Drew Barrymore" on Jimmy Kimmel Live!. She also announced the title of her debut studio album, initially titled A, but was later renamed to Ctrl. On April 28, 2017, SZA announced she had signed her first major-label recording contract with RCA Records. Following the announcement of Ctrl, SZA releases a promotional video narrated by rapper RZA. RZA opened with a dialogue stating "I’m zoning in with my homegirl, SZA—Self Savior, Zig-Zag-Zig Allah." Followed by a short verse "Yeah, I think you can take that far, Mama. Ya know what I mean? Cut loose the drama, no melodrama. Rise to the top, claim ya karma. And it’s my honor to drop this lesson, it’s my honor to give this blessing." On June 2, 2017, "Broken Clocks" was released as a promotional single, before being sent to urban contemporary radio in January 2018, serving as the album's fourth single. On June 8, 2017, "Doves in the Wind" was released as a promotional single.

On July 5, 2017, SZA announced an official North American headlining concert tour titled Ctrl the Tour to further promote the album. The tour began on August 20, 2017, in Providence, Rhode Island, at Fête Music Hall, and concluded on December 22, 2017, in Philadelphia, Pennsylvania at The Fillmore Philadelphia. Despite there being no European leg of the tour, on July 10, 2017, American singer and rapper Bryson Tiller announced that SZA would be opening for the European portion of his Set It Off Tour in support of his studio album True to Self from October 17, 2017, to November 30, 2017, separate from Ctrl the Tour. Due to tickets for Ctrl the Tour quickly selling out, this prompted additional dates to be added. Due to health problems, the first three dates of the tour were rescheduled, causing the tour to begin on August 20 instead of August 16 as originally scheduled. On July 31, 2017, SZA released a music video for "Supermodel", exclusively on Apple Music.

On December 9, 2017, SZA appeared on Saturday Night Live making her the third artist from her label to appear on the program following Lamar and Rock. The performance received critical acclaim for its power and a new verse she added to single "Love Galore" due to the absence of Travis Scott being there to perform his verse.

To celebrate the five-year anniversary of Ctrl, SZA released a deluxe edition of the album on June 9, 2022, containing seven bonus tracks. These include "2AM", previously uploaded on SoundCloud in 2016 as a standalone single; a version of "Love Galore" without Scott's verse; and a leaked Tyler, the Creator–produced demo from 2016 titled "Jodie". All seven songs came from SZA's Ctrl sessions between 2014 and 2017.

=== Singles ===
On January 13, 2017, SZA released the album's lead single "Drew Barrymore". It was produced by The Antydote and Carter Lang. On June 20, 2017, SZA released the music video for "Drew Barrymore", which featured a cameo by Drew Barrymore herself. Commercially, the song did not fare well since it was not released to radio but later earned the certification of Platinum by the RIAA.

On April 28, 2017, SZA released the album's second single "Love Galore", which features American rapper and singer Travis Scott. It was produced by ThankGod4Cody, Carter Lang, Scum and Punch. The music video for the song, directed by Nabil, premiered on April 27, 2017. It was uploaded to SZA's Vevo channel on April 28, 2017. Commercially, the song fared well in North America, charting on Canadian charts and entering the top 40 on the Billboard Hot 100, reaching number 30, later becoming certified 6× platinum by the RIAA.

On September 26, 2017, "The Weekend" was sent to urban contemporary radio as the album's third single. As of the chart dated January 3, 2018, it has peaked at number 29 on the Billboard Hot 100, becoming her highest charting solo single in that region. A music video for the song directed by Solange Knowles was officially released on December 22, 2017. It has been certified 5× platinum by the RIAA.

"Broken Clocks" was sent to urban contemporary radio on January 9, 2018, as the album's fourth single after being previously released as a promotional single as a part of the album's pre-order. As of October 2020, it has been certified 3× platinum by the RIAA.

"Garden (Say It like Dat)" was released as the album's fifth and final single on June 19, 2018, and has been 2× platinum by the RIAA.

== Critical reception ==
Professional ratings
Aggregate scores
Source	Rating
AnyDecentMusic?	8.1/10
Metacritic	87/100
Review scores
Source	Rating
AllMusic	5/5 stars
The A.V. Club	A−
Consequence of Sound	B+
Exclaim!	9/10
Financial Times	4/5 stars
The Irish Times	4/5 stars
The New Zealand Herald	5/5 stars
NME	4/5 stars
The Observer	4/5 stars
Pitchfork	8.4/10

Ctrl received widespread critical acclaim from music critics. At Metacritic, which assigns a weighted mean rating out of 100 to reviews from mainstream critics, the album received an average score of 87, based on 17 reviews, which indicates "universal acclaim". The Observer's Tara Joshi said the songs are "delicious slow jams with delicate yet powerful vocals and intimate insights into femininity, self-esteem and youth". Pitchfork's Claire Lobenfeld called the album "an opulent, raw R&B album that constantly tests the borders of the genre", and named "Prom" as one of the standout tracks. Siena Yates of The New Zealand Herald described it as "a brutally honest, sonically rich leap down the rabbit hole."

In his review of the album, The New York Times's Jon Pareles said of SZA: "But now, she fully commands the foreground of her songs. Her voice is upfront, recorded to sound natural and unaffected, with all its grain and conversational quirks." Vibe's Jessica McKinny said the album "has definitely kick-started her journey in the right direction. It's raw, soulful, rhythmic and uplifting in all the right places and will surely be a summer gift for old and new fans." She also referred to the album as "stripped down perfection". Gerrick D. Kennedy of Los Angeles Times called the album "equal parts aching, brazen and gorgeously honest" and said of the songs, "The records are tender, vulnerable and often defiant."

Ryan B. Patrick of Exclaim! referred to SZA as "the full package in terms of artistry: killer singing and songwriting abilities with a distinct perspective on life, love and destiny". He went on to say that Ctrl "is craft in action, a uniquely excellent album from a uniquely excellent artist." Paste's Nastia Voynovskaya called the album "strikingly relatable" and likened her vocals to that of Amy Winehouse and Billie Holiday. Jamie Milton of NME said it "effortlessly winds between narratives and genres like it's child's play" and went on to say that the artist "isn't a star in the making, it's a fully-fledged talent who's practically showing off." They also named "Prom" as the standout song of the album.

In July 2022, Rolling Stone ranked Ctrl at number 28 on its list of "100 Best Debut Albums of All Time", claiming that "she came out looking like a hero."

=== Accolades ===
Year-end lists
Publication	List	Rank	Ref.
Exclaim!	Top 10 Soul & R&B Albums of 2017	1	
New York Daily News	The 25 Best Albums of 2017	1	
Noisey	The 100 Best Albums of 2017	1	
Time	The Top 10 Best Albums of 2017	1	
Vice	The 100 Best Albums of 2017	1	
Billboard	Billboard 50 Best Albums of 2017: Critics' Picks	2	
Dazed	The 20 Best Albums of 2017	2	
The New York Times (by Jon Caramanica)	The Best Albums of 2017	2	
NPR	The 50 Best Albums of 2017	2	
Pitchfork	The 50 Best Albums of 2017	2	
The Skinny	The Skinny's Top 50 Albums of 2017	2	
Uproxx	50 Best Albums of 2017	2	
Complex	The Best Albums of 2017	3	
Entertainment Weekly	Best Albums of 2017: EW Picks 25 Greatest	3	
The Irish Times	Ticket Awards 2017; The best music of the year	3	
Mashable	10 Favorite Albums of 2017	3	
NOW	The Top 10 Best Albums of 2017	3	
Rap-Up	Rap-Up's 20 Best Albums of 2017	3	
Crack Magazine	The Top Albums of 2017	4	
FUSE	The 20 Best Albums of 2017	4	
The A.V. Club	The A.V. Club's 20 Best Albums of 2017	5	
The Independent	The 30 Best Albums of 2017	5	
Stereogum	The 50 Best Albums of 2017	5	
USA Today	USA Today's 10 Favourite albums of 2017	5	
The New Zealand Herald	The Best Albums of 2017	6	
The Sunday Times	The 100 Best Albums of the Year	6	
Atlantic Monthly	The 10 Best Albums of 2017	7	
Consequence of Sound	The Top 50 Albums of 2017	7	
NME	NME's Albums of the Year 2017	7	
Time Out	29 Albums of 2017 You Need to Know	7	
The New York Times (by Jon Pareles)	The Best Albums of 2017	8	
Loud and Quiet	The Loud and Quiet Top 40 Albums of 2017	9	
People	10 Best Albums of 2017	10	
The Stranger	The Top 10 Albums of 2017	12	
Slant	The 25 Best Albums of 2017	15	
Rolling Stone	50 Best Albums of 2017	20	
Paste	The 50 Best Albums of 2017	25	
Q	50 Best Albums of 2017	27	
Gorilla vs. Bear	Gorilla vs Bear Albums of 2017	28	
Drowned in Sound	Favourite Albums in 2017	42	
Uncut	75 Best Albums of 2017	53	
Resident	The Resident Annual 2017	65	
The Quietus	Albums of the Year 2017	68	

SZA received five nominations at the 60th Annual Grammy Awards (2018) including Best New Artist, Best Urban Contemporary Album for Ctrl, Best R&B Performance for "The Weekend", Best R&B Song "Supermodel" and Best Rap/Sung Performance for "Love Galore" featuring Travis Scott.

== Commercial performance ==
Ctrl debuted at number 3 on the US Billboard 200 chart, earning 60,000 album-equivalent units (including 20,000 copies as pure album sales) in its first week. This became SZA's first US top 10 debut. The album also accumulated 49.52 million streams for its songs that week. In its second week, the album dropped to #11 on the charts. In August 2022, the album was certified triple platinum by the RIAA for combined sales and album-equivalent units of over three million units in the United States. As of February 2025, the album has spent 400 weeks on the Billboard 200 chart, making it the second longest-charting R&B album by a woman, behind Anti by Rihanna, according to The New York Times.

== Track listing ==
Ctrl track listing
No.	Title	Writer(s)	Producer(s)	Length
1.	"Supermodel"	Solána Rowe; Tyran Donaldson; Terrence Henderson; Greg Landfair, Jr.	Scum	3:01
2.	"Love Galore" (featuring Travis Scott)	Rowe; Jacques Webster II; Cody Fayne; Carter Lang; Donaldson; Henderson	ThankGod4Cody; Lang; Scum	4:35
3.	"Doves in the Wind" (featuring Kendrick Lamar)	Rowe; Kendrick Duckworth; Cameron Osteen; Reggie Noble; John Bowman; Dana Stinson; Trevor Smith; James Yancey	Cam O'bi	4:26
4.	"Drew Barrymore"	Rowe; Lang; Donaldson; Henderson; Macie Stewart	Lang; Scum	3:51
5.	"Prom"	Rowe; Donaldson; Lang	Scum; Lang^{[a]}	3:16
6.	"The Weekend"	Rowe; Fayne; Justin Timberlake; Timothy Mosley; Nathaniel Hills	ThankGod4Cody	4:32
7.	"Go Gina"	Rowe; Donaldson; Lang; Adam Feeney	Scum; Lang; Frank Dukes^{[a]}	2:41
8.	"Garden (Say It like Dat)"	Rowe; Daniel Tannenbaum; Craig Balmoris	Bēkon; Balmoris^{[a]}; The Donuts^{[a]}	3:28
9.	"Broken Clocks"	Rowe; Fayne; Feeney; Thomas Paxton-Beesley; Ashton Simmonds	ThankGod4Cody; Frank Dukes	3:51
10.	"Anything"	Rowe; Donaldson; Lang; Donna Summer; Giorgio Moroder; Pete Bellotte; Peter Wilkins	Scum; Lang^{[a]}	2:29
11.	"Wavy (Interlude)" (featuring James Fauntleroy)	Rowe; James Fauntleroy II; Fayne; Lukasz Plas	ThankGod4Cody; Prophit	1:15
12.	"Normal Girl"	Rowe; Lang; Donaldson; Henderson	Lang; Scum	4:13
13.	"Pretty Little Birds" (featuring Isaiah Rashad)	Rowe; Isaiah McClain; Donaldson; Lang; Josef Leimberg	Scum; Lang; Leimberg	4:05
14.	"20 Something"	Rowe; Lang; Donaldson	Lang; Scum	3:18
Total length:				49:01

Digital deluxe edition (bonus tracks)
No.	Title	Writer(s)	Producer(s)	Length
15.	"Love Galore" (alt version)	Rowe; Fayne; Lang; Donaldson; Henderson	ThankGod4Cody; Lang; Scum	4:33
16.	"2AM"	Rowe; Fayne; Aubrey Graham; Jahron Brathwaite; Noah Shebib	ThankGod4Cody	4:02
17.	"Miles"	Rowe; Donaldson	Scum	1:09
18.	"Percolator"	Rowe; Fayne; Donaldson; Charlene Keys; Craig Brockman; Nisan Stewart	ThankGod4Cody; Scum	1:24
19.	"Tread Carefully"	Rowe; Fayne	ThankGod4Cody	3:02
20.	"Awkward"	Rowe; Michael Uzowuru	Uzowuru	2:58
21.	"Jodie"	Rowe; Tyler Okonma	Tyler, the Creator	2:45

Notes

- ^{^[a]} signifies an additional producer

Sample credits

- "Doves in the Wind" contains a sample of the recording "Let's Get Dirty (I Can't Get in da Club)", written by Reggie Noble, John Bowman and Dana Stinson and performed by Redman, and an interpolation from "Turn Me Up Some", written by Trevor Smith and James Yancey and performed by Busta Rhymes.
- "The Weekend" contains elements of "Set the Mood (Prelude)", written by Justin Timberlake, Timothy Mosley and Floyd Hills and performed by Justin Timberlake.
- "Broken Clocks" embodies portions of "West", written by Thomas Paxton-Beesley, Adam Feeney and Ashton Simmonds and performed by River Tiber featuring Daniel Caesar.
- "Anything" contains a sample of the recording "Spring Affair", written by Giorgio Moroder, Pete Bellotte and Donna Summer and performed by Donna Summer.
- "Normal Girl" contains an interpolation of "Controlla" by Drake.
- "2AM" interpolates "Come and See Me" by PartyNextDoor and Drake.

== Personnel ==
Technical

- Lukasz Plas – recording
- James Hunt – recording
- Juan Carlos – recording, engineering (track 7)
- Jared "JT" Gagarin – recording, engineering (track 12)
- Blake Harden – recording, engineering (Travis Scott on track 2; track 14)
- Tyler Page – recording
- Cyrus Taghipour – recording
- Ivan Corpening – recording
- Chris Classick – recording, engineering (tracks 2, 6, 9)
- Hector Castro – recording, engineering (track 8), mixing (track 8)
- Prophit – engineering (tracks 3–5, 11, 13)
- Ray Charles Brown – engineering (track 1)
- Matt Schaeffer – engineering (Kendrick Lamar on track 3)
- Bēkon – engineering (track 8)
- Scum – engineering (track 10)
- Josef Leimberg – engineering (Isaiah Rashad on track 13)
- Derek "MixedByAli" Ali – mixing
- Mike Bozzi – mastering

Performance

- Stix – additional drums (track 1)
- Pharrell Williams – programmatic drums (track 1)
- Macie Stewart – strings (track 4)
- Peter Cottontale – bass (track 10)
- Mommy – skit (tracks 1, 4, 14)
- Granny – skit (track 3)

Design

- SZA – creative direction, visual direction, styling, A&R
- Terrence "Punch" Henderson – creative direction, A&R
- Sage Adams – visual direction, photography
- Vlad Sepetov – graphic design and packaging
- Joshua Patrick – A&R coordinator
- Roberto "Ret One" Reyes – graphic design and packaging
- Christopher Parsons – photography
- Jason Chandler – photography
- Dianne Garcia – styling
- Integral Studio – technical direction

== Charts ==
=== Weekly charts ===
Weekly chart performance for Ctrl
Chart (2017–2025)	Peak position
Australian Albums (ARIA)	13
Australian Hip Hop/R&B Albums (ARIA)	3
Belgian Albums (Ultratop Flanders)	125
Canadian Albums (Billboard)	10
Dutch Albums (Album Top 100)	58
French Albums (SNEP)	166
Irish Albums (Official Charts)	27
New Zealand Albums (RMNZ)	11
Portuguese Albums (AFP)	62
South Korea International Albums (Circle)	12
Spanish Albums (Promusicae)	79
Swiss Albums (Schweizer Hitparade)	96
UK Albums (Official Charts)	45
UK R&B Albums (Official Charts)	10
US Billboard 200	3
US Top R&B/Hip-Hop Albums (Billboard)	2

=== Year-end charts ===
2017 year-end chart performance for Ctrl
Chart (2017)	Position
Australian Urban Albums (ARIA)	50
US Billboard 200	42
US Top R&B/Hip-Hop Albums (Billboard)	18

2018 year-end chart performance for Ctrl
Chart (2018)	Position
New Zealand Albums (RMNZ)	45
US Billboard 200	31
US Top R&B/Hip-Hop Albums (Billboard)	19

2019 year-end chart performance for Ctrl
Chart (2019)	Position
US Billboard 200	99

2020 year-end chart performance for Ctrl
Chart (2020)	Position
US Billboard 200	110
US Top R&B/Hip-Hop Albums (Billboard)	99

2021 year-end chart performance for Ctrl
Chart (2021)	Position
Australian Albums (ARIA)	89
US Billboard 200	63
US Top R&B/Hip-Hop Albums (Billboard)	35

2022 year-end chart performance for Ctrl
Chart (2022)	Position
Australian Albums (ARIA)	97
New Zealand Albums (RMNZ)	32
US Billboard 200	50
US Top R&B/Hip-Hop Albums (Billboard)	23

2023 year-end chart performance for Ctrl
Chart (2023)	Position
Australian Albums (ARIA)	74
New Zealand Albums (RMNZ)	27
US Billboard 200	28
US Top R&B/Hip-Hop Albums (Billboard)	11

2024 year-end chart performance for Ctrl
Chart (2024)	Position
Australian Albums (ARIA)	52
Australian Hip Hop/R&B Albums (ARIA)	13
US Billboard 200	42
US Top R&B/Hip-Hop Albums (Billboard)	11

2025 year-end chart performance for Ctrl
Chart (2025)	Position
US Billboard 200	48
US Top R&B/Hip-Hop Albums (Billboard)	14

=== Decade-end charts ===
Decade-end chart performance for Ctrl
Chart (2010–2019)	Position
US Billboard 200	111

== Certifications ==
Certifications for Ctrl
Region	Certification	Certified units/sales
Australia (ARIA)	Platinum	70,000^{‡}
Brazil (Pro-Música Brasil)	Gold	20,000^{‡}
Canada (Music Canada)	2× Platinum	160,000^{‡}
Denmark (IFPI Danmark)	Platinum	20,000^{‡}
France (SNEP)	Gold	50,000^{‡}
New Zealand (RMNZ)	5× Platinum	75,000^{‡}
United Kingdom (BPI)	Platinum	300,000^{‡}
United States (RIAA)	6× Platinum	6,000,000^{‡}
^{‡} Sales+streaming figures based on certification alone.

== See also ==
- List of Billboard number 1 R&B/hip-hop albums of 2017
