= Ctrl the Tour =

2017–2018 concert tour by SZA

- Tour by SZA
- Location: Australia; Canada; New Zealand; United States
- Associated album: Ctrl
- Start date: August 20, 2017
- End date: February 8, 2018
- Legs: 3
- No. of shows: 55
- Supporting acts: Smino; Ravyn Lenae

SZA concert chronology
- Ctrl the Tour (2017–2018); The Championship Tour (2018)

Ctrl the Tour was the debut concert tour by the American singer-songwriter SZA. in support of her debut album, Ctrl. The tour consisted of 55 live performances across the United States, Canada, Australia and New Zealand.

== Background and promotion ==
SZA premiered "Drew Barrymore" on Jimmy Kimmel Live!. She also announced the title of her debut studio album, initially titled A, but later renamed to Ctrl. On April 28, 2017, she announced she had signed her first major-label recording contract with RCA Records. Following the announcement of Ctrl, she released a promotional video narrated by rapper RZA." On June 2, 2017, "Broken Clocks" was released as a promotional single before being sent to urban contemporary radio in January 2018 as the album's fourth single. On June 8, 2017 "Doves in the Wind" was released as a promotional single.

On July 5, 2017, SZA announced an official North American headlining concert tour titled Ctrl the Tour to further promote the album. The tour began on August 20, 2017, in Providence, Rhode Island, at Fête Music Hall, and concluded on December 22, 2017, in Philadelphia, Pennsylvania at The Fillmore Philadelphia.

Despite the tour having no european leg, American singer and rapper Bryson Tiller announced on July 10, 2017 that SZA would be opening for the European portion of his Set It Off Tour in support of his studio album True to Self from October 17, 2017, to November 30, 2017, separate from Ctrl the Tour. Due to tickets for Ctrl the Tour quickly selling out, this prompted additional dates to be added. Due to health problems, the first three dates of the tour were rescheduled, causing the tour to begin on August 20 instead of August 16 as originally scheduled. On July 31, 2017, SZA released a music video for "Supermodel", exclusively on Apple Music.

On December 9, 2017, SZA appeared on Saturday Night Live making her the third artist from her label to appear on the program following Lamar and Rock. The performance received critical acclaim for its power and a new verse she added to single "Love Galore" due to the absence of Travis Scott being there to perform his verse.

== Set list ==
This set list is representative of the show on August 20, 2017, in Providence, Rhode Island. It does not represent the set list from all of the shows. It consists of twelve tracks from Ctrl (2017) and three tracks from Z (2014).

1. "Supermodel"
2. "Anything"
3. "Broken Clocks"
4. "Go Gina"
5. "Drew Barrymore"
6. "HiiiJack"
7. "Child's Play"
8. "Normal Girl"
9. "Prom"
10. "Garden (Say It like Dat)"
11. "Doves in the Wind"
12. "Love Galore"
13. "The Weekend"
14. "Wavy (Interlude)"
15. "Babylon"

== Tour dates ==
List of 2017 concerts, showing date, city, country, venue, opening acts, tickets sold, and gross revenue.
Date	City	Country	Venue	Opening acts
August 20, 2017	Providence	United States	Fête Music Hall	Smino; Ravyn Lenae
August 21, 2017	Richmond	United States	The National	Smino; Ravyn Lenae
August 22, 2017	Montréal	Canada	Corona Theatre	Smino; Ravyn Lenae
August 23, 2017	Toronto	Canada	REBEL	Smino; Ravyn Lenae
August 25, 2017	Boston	United States	Royale Nightclub	Smino; Ravyn Lenae
August 26, 2017^{[A]}	New York City	United States	Commodore Barry Park	—N/a
August 27, 2017	Philadelphia	United States	The Fillmore Philadelphia	Smino; Ravyn Lenae
August 29, 2017	Grand Rapids	United States	The Intersection	Smino; Ravyn Lenae
August 30, 2017	Detroit	United States	The Fillmore Detroit	Smino; Ravyn Lenae
August 31, 2017	Chicago	United States	Concord Music Hall	Smino; Ravyn Lenae
September 1, 2017	Minneapolis	United States	First Avenue	Smino; Ravyn Lenae
September 3, 2017	Kansas City	United States	Uptown Theater	Smino; Ravyn Lenae
September 5, 2017	Lincoln	United States	Bourbon Theatre	Smino; Ravyn Lenae
September 6, 2017	Englewood	United States	Gothic Theatre	Smino; Ravyn Lenae
September 8, 2017	Paradise	United States	Vinyl	Ravyn Lenae
September 9, 2017^{[B]}	Anaheim	United States	Angel Stadium	—N/a
September 10, 2017	Sacramento	United States	Ace of Spades	Smino; Ravyn Lenae
September 12, 2017	Santa Cruz	United States	The Catalyst	Smino; Ravyn Lenae
September 13, 2017	Eugene	United States	W.O.W. Hall	Smino; Ravyn Lenae
September 14, 2017	Vancouver	Canada	Commodore Ballroom	Smino; Ravyn Lenae
September 16, 2017	Portland	United States	Roseland Theater	Smino; Ravyn Lenae
September 17, 2017	Seattle	United States	Neptune Theatre	Smino; Ravyn Lenae
September 19, 2017	San Francisco	United States	The Warfield Theatre	Smino; Ravyn Lenae
September 21, 2017	Tempe	United States	Marquee Theatre	Ravyn Lenae
September 22, 2017	Tucson	United States	Rialto Theatre	Ravyn Lenae
September 25, 2017	Los Angeles	United States	The Novo	Smino; Ravyn Lenae
September 28, 2017	New Orleans	United States	House of Blues New Orleans	Ravyn Lenae
September 29, 2017	Dallas	United States	South Side Music Hall	Smino; Ravyn Lenae
September 30, 2017	San Antonio	United States	Alamo City Music Hall	Smino; Ravyn Lenae
October 1, 2017	Austin	United States	Emo's	Smino; Ravyn Lenae
October 3, 2017	Houston	United States	Warehouse Live	Smino; Ravyn Lenae
October 5, 2017^{[C]}	Nashville	United States	Memorial Gymnasium	—N/a
October 7, 2017	Miami	United States	The Ground	Ravyn Lenae
October 8, 2017	Tampa	United States	The Orpheum	Smino; Ravyn Lenae
October 9, 2017	Atlanta	United States	The Tabernacle	Smino; Ravyn Lenae
October 11, 2017	Greensboro	United States	Cone Denim Entertainment Center	Smino; Ravyn Lenae
October 12, 2017	Charlotte	United States	The Fillmore Charlotte	Smino; Ravyn Lenae
November 14, 2017	Los Angeles	United States	The Novo	—N/a
December 10, 2017	New York City	United States	Brooklyn Steel	Ravyn Lenae; Smino
December 11, 2017	New York City	United States	Irving Plaza	Ravyn Lenae; Smino
December 13, 2017	Cleveland	United States	House of Blues Cleveland	Ravyn Lenae; Smino
December 15, 2017	Indianapolis	United States	Old National Centre	Ravyn Lenae; Smino
December 16, 2017	Louisville	United States	Mercury Ballroom	Ravyn Lenae; Smino
December 17, 2017	St. Louis	United States	The Ready Room	Ravyn Lenae; Smino
December 19, 2017	St. Louis	United States	The Ready Room	Ravyn Lenae; Smino
December 20, 2017	Chicago	United States	Concord Music Hall	Ravyn Lenae; Smino

List of 2018 concerts, showing date, city, country, venue, opening acts, tickets sold, and gross revenue.
Date	City	Country	Venue	Opening acts
January 9, 2018	Auckland	New Zealand	Logan Campbell Centre	—N/a
January 14, 2018	Sydney	Australia	Enmore Theatre	—
January 15, 2018	Honolulu	United States	The Republik	—N/a
January 18, 2018	Honolulu	United States	The Republik	—N/a
January 31, 2018	Philadelphia	United States	The Fillmore Philadelphia	—N/a
February 2, 2018	Norfolk	United States	The NorVa	—N/a
February 3, 2018	Baltimore	United States	Rams Head Live!	—N/a
February 5, 2018	Silver Spring	United States	The Fillmore Silver Spring	—N/a
February 8, 2018	New Haven	United States	Toad's Place	—N/a

== Notes ==
- A The show on August 26, 2017, in New York City is part of the 2017 Afropunk Festival.
- B The show on September 9, 2017, in Anaheim is part of the 2017 Day N Night Fest.
- C The show on October 5, 2017, in Nashville is part of the 2017 Commodore Quake concert with Migos.
