= Broken Clocks =

Single by SZA

from the album Ctrl
- Released: December 15, 2017
- Genre: Alternative R&B
- Length: 3:51
- Label: Top Dawg; RCA
- Songwriters: Solána Rowe; Thomas Paxton-Beesley; Ashton Simmonds; Adam Feeney; Cody Fayne
- Producer: ThankGod4Cody

SZA singles chronology
"All the Stars" (2018)	"Broken Clocks" (2017)	"Garden (Say It like Dat)" (2018)

Music video
- "Broken Clocks" on YouTube

"Broken Clocks" is a song by the American singer-songwriter SZA. The song was originally released as the first promotional single on June 2, 2017, from her debut studio album, Ctrl. It was later sent to urban contemporary radio as the album's fourth single on December 15, 2017. "Broken Clocks" was written by SZA and producer ThankGod4Cody. It samples "West", which was written by River Tiber, Frank Dukes, and Daniel Caesar and performed by the former. SZA performed the song at the 60th Annual Grammy Awards.

== Background ==
The song was released a week ahead of the album's release, as a promotional single on mainstream music platforms. "Broken Clocks" is a follow-up to the songs "Drew Barrymore" and "Love Galore", both of which were released from SZA's album, Ctrl.

== Music video ==
The music video for "Broken Clocks" was co-directed by SZA and Dave Free, and was released on March 30, 2018. The video features SZA at a summer camp in the wilderness. As the song comes to a close, the camera cuts to SZA as a stripper, lying unconscious on the bathroom floor of a strip club, following an altercation with another woman. The video features cameo appearances from SZA's TDE label-mates Ab-Soul, Jay Rock, Schoolboy Q and Isaiah Rashad.

== Critical reception ==
"Broken Clocks" was met with critical acclaim. Jon Pareles of The New York Times felt, "'Broken Clocks' enfolds SZA amid blurry keyboard tones and a watery sample of men's voices as she ponders memories of an old romance that still haunts her." Joshua Espinoza of Complex magazine regarded the song as "a mid-tempo cut about optimism and perseverance". Lauren Ziegler of Consequence of Sound opined, "'Broken Clocks' is slinky and laid back, with confidence and suggestiveness/passion dripping from each note. Though more energetic and pointed than the minimalistic 'Love Galore', it still retains a kind of sleek raspiness so unique to the Top Dawg Entertainment artist's sound." Desire Thompson of Vibe magazine argued that SZA has "proven herself to be a talented storyteller between harmonious melodies" and "finds a creative way to highlight the plight of a topsy-tuvy love" with the release of this song. Adelle Platon of Billboard magazine described the song as "nostalgic", while Navjosh of HipHop-N-More described the song as a "soothing mid tempo ballad which is sure to get numerous plays once you start listening". Darby McNally of Paste magazine said, "'Broken Clocks' is a cool, smooth tune with a hint of modernity, a combination that is beginning to be SZA's calling card." Tom Breihan of Stereogum wrote that the song is "a bit of a departure from the hazy sounds of SZA's past work" and has "gasping synths and trap hi-hat skitters, and puts her breathy, expressive vocals in a more commercial light."

The Guardian critic Alexis Petridis called "Broken Clocks" SZA's best song in a 2025 ranking of her discography. He wrote that it encapsulated the reasons why SZA's songwriting was relatable for many people, citing its confessional and conversational tone. Petridis also praised her vocals for giving the impression that "she's confiding in the listener", and the composition for its blend of trap and "R&B classicism".

== Live performances ==
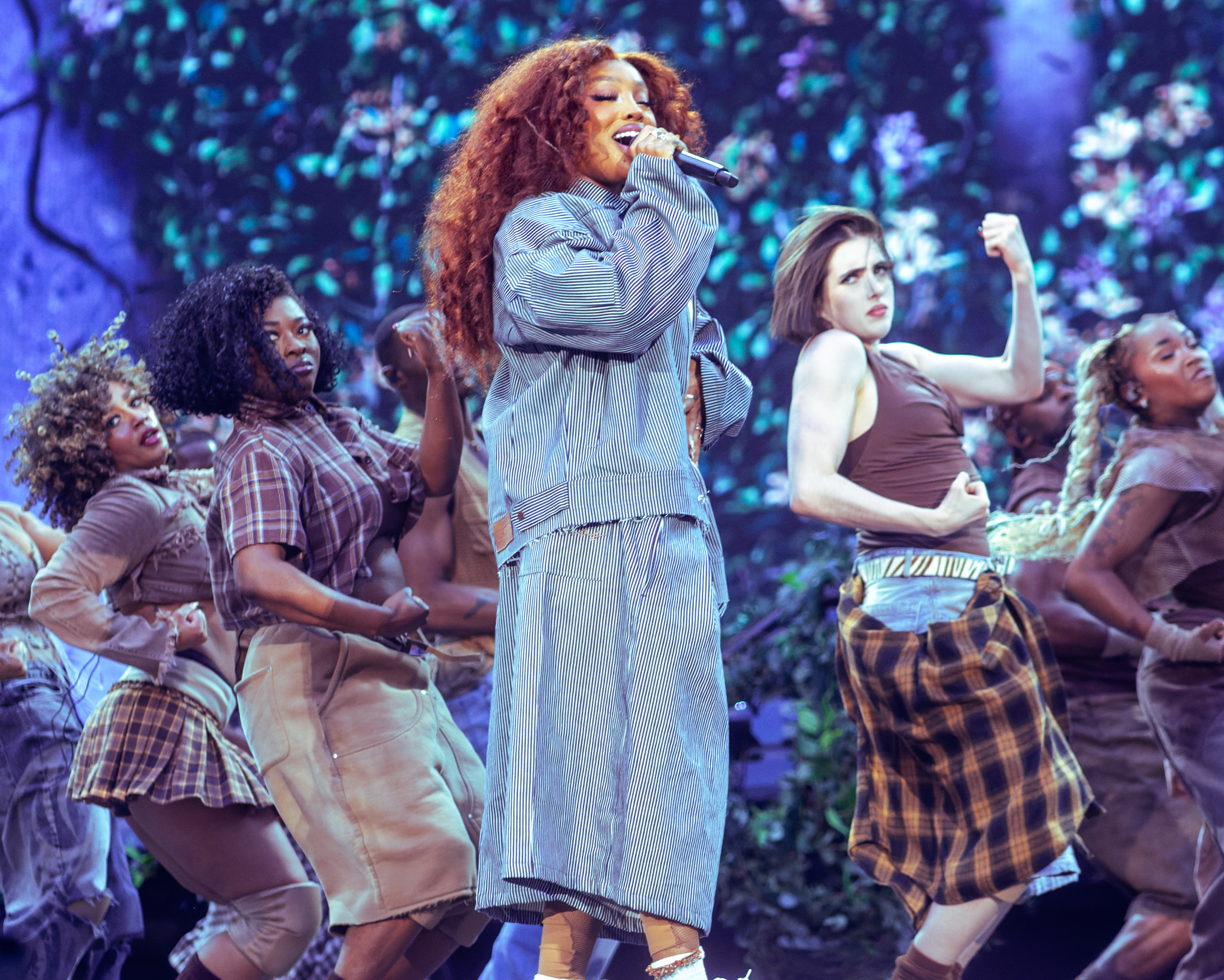
SZA performing "Broken Clocks" on the Grand National Tour in London

SZA performed "Broken Clocks" during the SOS Tour (2023–2024). She has also included the song on the set list of her co-headlining Grand National Tour (2025) with rapper Kendrick Lamar.

== Charts ==
=== Weekly charts ===
Chart (2017–2018)	Peak position
US Billboard Hot 100	82
US Hot R&B/Hip-Hop Songs (Billboard)	39
US R&B/Hip-Hop Airplay (Billboard)	12
US Rhythmic Airplay (Billboard)	36

=== Year-end charts ===
Chart (2017)	Position
US Hot R&B Songs (Billboard)	48

Chart (2018)	Position
US Hot R&B Songs (Billboard)	17

== Certifications ==
Region	Certification	Certified units/sales
Brazil (Pro-Música Brasil)	Gold	20,000^{‡}
Canada (Music Canada)	2× Platinum	160,000^{‡}
New Zealand (RMNZ)	3× Platinum	90,000^{‡}
United Kingdom (BPI)	Platinum	600,000^{‡}
United States (RIAA)	8× Platinum	8,000,000^{‡}
^{‡} Sales+streaming figures based on certification alone.

== Release history ==
Region	Date	Format	Label	Ref.
United States	June 2, 2017 (Note: Release as a promotional single.)	Digital download	Top Dawg; RCA	
United States	December 15, 2017	Urban contemporary radio	Top Dawg; RCA	
