= PSA (song) =

2023 song by SZA

Song by SZA

from the album SOS Deluxe: Lana (extended)
- Written: 2022
- Released: January 5, 2023 (SOS bonus track); February 9, 2025 (Lana bonus track)
- Recorded: 2022
- Length: 1:39
- Label: Top Dawg; RCA
- Songwriters: Solána Rowe; Rob Bisel; Carter Lang; Will Miller
- Producers: Rob Bisel; Carter Lang; Will Miller

Lyric video
- "PSA" on YouTube

"PSA" is a song by American singer-songwriter SZA, used for the official trailer of her second studio album, SOS (2022). It had a limited release on January 5, 2023, as part of a download-only edition of the album, and was released via streaming services on February 9, 2025, as a bonus track from SOS Deluxe: Lana (2024).

"PSA" is an orchestral song with a simple, stringed production, consisting of pianos and harps alongside vocal harmonies. The lyrics are delivered in a rap cadence and with braggadocio; SZA demands that people call her nothing but number-one and serve her, says she takes pleasure in angering people, and mocks those she views as "bottom feeders".

SZA has performed "PSA" several times during the SOS Tour as the concert opener, as well as at a surprise concert celebrating the release of SOS. The song was used for the official teaser for SOS, yet despite this, it did not appear on the final track list for the standard edition. It was also intended to appear on the initial release of Lana but was scrapped by SZA's manager.

== Background ==
SZA released her debut studio album, Ctrl, in 2017. Primarily an R&B album with lyrics that address facets of contemporary life and romance, it was commercially successful and received considerable acclaim. Critics credit it for being innovative within the R&B genre and establishing her as a major figure in contemporary pop and R&B music. (Note: Cited to The Line of Best Fit, NME, The Daily Telegraph, The New Yorker, and Consequence) Even so, she grew discontented with being classified as an R&B musician; she later stated that she felt like her music was being reductively categorized because she was a Black woman.

After the album's release, media began speculating on when her next one, SOS, would arrive. Within the following years, SZA began releasing the first singles from the album, fueling anticipation for SOS, starting with "Good Days" in 2020. "I Hate U" followed in 2021, and "Shirt", which she had been teasing since 2020, was released in October 2022.

Upon releasing "Shirt", she posted on Twitter to reveal that it was finally "album time", and outlets surmised that it would have a December release upon noticing that a car had the date written on the license plate. Later on November 8, during SZA's 33rd birthday, she celebrated the occasion by uploading a video to her YouTube account, which uses a snippet of a song titled "PSA", reposting it on social media with the caption "clock starts now."

== Music and lyrics ==
SZA sought to prove her musical versatility with SOS by imbuing her established sound with elements from multiple genres; one of her visions for the album was to make songs that were orchestral and simple but at the same time aggressive. Producer Carter Lang met with Will Miller alongside two other producers to create around 20 demos that incorporated this sound, inspired by what Lang described to Rolling Stone Music Now as "very minimal" and "beautifully haunting" pieces. Among the demos were "PSA", also called "Potting Season", alongside the standard edition track "Blind". After they arranged the layering on the demos, they sent the songs to SZA for her to write lyrics.

Being an orchestral track, "PSA" is a song that consists of soft piano and harps. SZA raps in a braggadocious manner as she harmonizes in the background; in the lyrics, she demands that people call her nothing but "number-one" and serve her so she can cope with her problems, because she doesn't "know how to take losses [...] even when they are lost causes." She also says she takes pleasure in making people angry—"pissing [them] off just to get off"—then mocks "bottom feeders" who "suck dick by the liter", perceiving them as of less value than her. The closing lines are "you should go cry about it, not trying to fight about it."

== Release ==
=== As SOS bonus track ===
The "PSA" teaser for SOS was directed by Bradley J. Calder, with pyrotechnic and luminescent visual effects by Rick Braukis. Nearly two minutes long, it features alternating shots of SZA in two scenes: in one, she wears a brown bikini and crouches in a ring of neon green fire, and in the other, she pours blue, fluorescent liquid over her naked self by a beach. As the teaser ends, she makes her way towards the sea, and the video cuts to black before playing Morse code for the SOS distress signal.

SOS spent ten weeks at number one on the US Billboard 200, and the tracking week ending January 6, 2023, marked its fourth week at the top. For the following week, there was a chance that Taylor Swift's Midnights (2022) might replace SOS at number one. On January 5, when tracking was about to end, SZA and Swift tried to boost their respective albums by releasing digital versions that contained exclusive bonus material. SZA's version was available to purchase only on Top Dawg's website, and it contained all 23 tracks from the standard edition alongside two previously unreleased songs. "PSA" was one of the two, and the solo version of "Open Arms" was the other.

=== As Lana bonus track ===
SOS was released on December 9, 2022, and despite being used for the teaser, "PSA" was not one of the 23 songs that made the final cut. SZA said that Punch, president of her label Top Dawg Entertainment, encouraged to excludes unreleased tracks like "PSA" on the standard edition despite her and her fans' wishes because it did not fit with his vision for SOS. According to SZA, he told her that the song sounded "too much like 'Blind'" and "people [would] get bored of hearing" it, saying that only one of them should be on the track list.

As a response, SZA suggested that "PSA" could be a bonus track on the album's deluxe edition. The edition developed into an album reissue she called Lana, which would consist in large part of SOS outtakes. However, like with SOS, Punch scrapped the song from its tracklist. Hours after Lana's release, SZA posted on social media to share text conversations with him, in which she asked permission to release "PSA" sometime soon. Punch replied by saying she can "give it to [the fans] for new years or Christmas."

Due to the holiday break, the label postponed the release to January 6, 2025. The release was postponed again, following some issues with a sample clearance. After a few weeks, SZA's official website was updated to reveal a new release date of February 9. The exact time was 7PM Eastern Time, around an hour before her performance with Kendrick Lamar at the 2025 Super Bowl.

== Live performances ==
The first live performance of "PSA" was during the SOS Tour, debuted at her concert at the Schottenstein Center in Columbus, Ohio, on February 21, 2023. Her set lists for the European and North American legs started with "PSA", which she performed as she recreated the album cover art on stage, atop a diving board with a screen behind her that projected a video of the ocean. Once she was done with the song, the screen showed her dive into water below.

SZA also played "PSA" during an invitation-only album celebration event in Brooklyn, New York, in September 2023 as the third out of seven songs on the set list, which included three other songs intended for the deluxe edition. When she headlined Glastonbury on June 30, 2024, she included "PSA" as her set's opener.

== Release history ==
Release dates and formats for "PSA"
| Region | Date | Label | Version | Ref. |
|---|---|---|---|---|
| Various | January 5, 2023 | Digital download Website | Top Dawg; RCA | |
| Various | February 9, 2025 | Digital download; streaming | Top Dawg; RCA | |
