= Joni (song) =

- SoundCloud cover art

Song by SZA featuring Don Toliver

from the album SOS Deluxe: Lana (extended)
- Written: January 2020
- Released: February 9, 2025
- Recorded: January 2020
- Genre: Folk
- Length: 2:07
- Label: Top Dawg; RCA
- Songwriters: Solána Rowe; Caleb Toliver; Rob Bisel; Steven Paul Smith
- Producer: Rob Bisel

Lyric video
- "Joni" on YouTube

"Joni" is a song by American singer-songwriter SZA featuring fellow American rapper and singer-songwriter Don Toliver. It was released on February 9, 2025, as part of the extended version of SOS Deluxe: Lana, the reissue of her second studio album, SOS (2022). Inspired by the music of singer-songwriter Joni Mitchell, "Joni" combines realist and idealist writing styles, discussing SZA's love for her family and desire to overcome challenges in pursuit of perfection. The song samples "Angeles" (1997) by Elliott Smith.

Before its official release, "Joni" was uploaded on SoundCloud on August 22, 2021, and was leaked sometime during recording sessions for Lana. The song was intended for the reissue as well as SOS, but it was scrapped from both projects by SZA's manager, Punch.

== Background ==
I just don’t know what represents me at this time [...] I don't know if I want to do aggressive me, or trap me, or Joni Mitchell me, or falsetto me, or acoustic me [...] but it's all there. It's just a matter of what picture I want to paint. What world do I want to build?

— SZA, 2020 Wonderland interview

After the 2017 release of her debut studio album Ctrl, American singer-songwriter SZA began appearing in soundtracks and collaborations with several artists. As she did, media speculation on her next album's release date arose, and it heightened in 2020 upon the release of "Hit Different" and "Good Days", her first work as a sole lead artist in five years.

SZA told Wonderland magazine for their July cover story that working on new music had left her anxious, confused about the different facets of herself she could express with every song. For the album, she said, she experimented with trap beats, acoustic sounds, and falsetto vocals, even taking inspiration from the music of folk singer-songwriter Joni Mitchell. Earlier in February, she told Rolling Stone that a "trap song from the perspective of Joni Mitchell" had been created a month prior.

In May, SZA posted on Twitter to ask fans whether she should do a "music dump", which she said would consist of unreleased songs from the past six years. Three months later, on August 22, an anonymous SoundCloud account with only a single period as its username uploaded three songs to the platform, one of them named "Joni". SZA later posted on Twitter to say that she owned the account and described the songs as "random thoughts", adding that her astrologist encouraged her to surprise-release them.

== Music and lyrics ==
Two versions of "Joni" exist, the unreleased one being a trap version. The officially released version is a folk song, incorporating a fingerpicked guitar and sampling the song "Angeles" by Elliott Smith. Both versions were created in January 2020 during quarantine in Kauai, Hawaii, with producer Rob Bisel during the start of the COVID-19 pandemic.

"Joni" began with a freestyle, over a demo by SZA's long-time collaborator ThankGod4Cody, during which SZA prompted Bisel to suggest musicians whose music she could channel while freestyling. "Angeles" began playing after the demo, and SZA continued to freestyle. Curious on how the two would sound together, Bisel put her vocals on top of the song's guitars and noticed the similarities in tempo and keys, believing that this second version of "Joni" also sounded good. SZA agreed and decided to release that version to SoundCloud.

The lyrics are characterized by soulfulness, precision, brevity, and spontaneity. "Joni" conjures several descriptive scenes in quick succession, employing imagery of sex and money ("If the money right, is the pussy good?"), the golden hour ("The golden hour awaits for me"), the moon ("Moon corrals us to the water"), and the end of summer. Influences from Mitchell and Smith, according to Pitchfork's Jill Mapes, manifest in the song's blend of "stinging realism" with a "California dreamer" perspective. SZA sings in a soft and croon-like manner, often harmonizing her vocals.

Achieving perfection and practicing patience while dealing with life's challenges, shown through the line "I been wiped out like 3 times / Beat dat shit call me nine lives / I got perfect timing", are additional themes. The song employs a lyric change from "I got perfect timing" at the song's start to "We got perfect timing" at the end; the last lyric is interrupted by a whistle note. "Joni" also pays homage to SZA's family, with lines about how she misses her mother during the day's low tides and is willing to recite "a host of loving words" to her father. Upon hearing the song, her mother Aubrey Rowe said that it was simultaneously "soothing and distrupting", with "rich variations in texture, tone, and tempos".

== Release ==
Previewed as a 98-second snippet, "Joni" was the first of the three songs to be uploaded to SoundCloud; the others, "I Hate You" and "Nightbird", followed two hours later. The song was also called "Perfect Timing". SZA accompanied the release of "Joni" with an Instagram video of a dance by Nana Yaa, directed by SZA and shot by Blair Caldwell. It was intended for but excluded from the standard edition of SOS, her next studio album. Sometime later, "Joni" was removed from SZA's throwaway SoundCloud account.

The decision to scrap "Joni" was attributed to Punch, president of her label Top Dawg Entertainment, whom she described as very particular with track curation. His view was that the song had been available online for too long, adding that fans would find its inclusion on SOS unnecessary and rather hear new music. SZA thought of repurposing it as a track on SOS's deluxe edition, which she called Lana.

In 2023, while SZA was recording music for Lana, the full version of "Joni" leaked online. It prompted a response in a 2023 interview for Variety in which she asserted that fans "ruined" the song. Because of this, SZA was initially going to never release the song, though she had second thoughts. "Joni" did not appear on Lana when it was released on December 20, 2024.

On February 9, 2025, the song was finally released on official streaming platforms, as a track on an extended version of Lana. Originally, the extended version was set for release the previous month, but it faced multiple delays. The postponement was in part because the "Angeles" sample had yet to be cleared.

== Critical reception ==
In a 2025 ranking of SZA's discography, The Guardian critic Alexis Petridis rated "Joni" as her 13th-best song. He was grateful that SZA did not scrap a song with such "utterly lovely" music, praising the Mitchell inspiration and the use of the "Angeles" sample.

== Credits ==
Adapted from Tidal

- Solána Rowe (SZA) – vocals, songwriting
- Caleb Toliver (Don Toliver) – vocals, songwriting
- Steven Paul Smith (Elliott Smith) – songwriting
- Rob Bisel – songwriting, production, mixing
- Dale Becker – mastering
- Katie Harvey – assistant mastering
- Noah McCorkle – assistant mastering

== Charts ==
Weekly chart performance for "Joni"
Chart (2025)	Peak position
New Zealand Hot Singles (RMNZ)	35
