= Diamond Boy (DTM) =

Song by SZA

from the album SOS Deluxe: Lana
- Written: 2023
- Released: December 20, 2024
- Recorded: 2023
- Genre: R&B
- Length: 3:37
- Label: Top Dawg; RCA
- Songwriters: Solána Rowe; Tyran Donaldson; Cody Fayne; Carter Lang; Declan Miers; Jared Solomon; Michael Uzowuru
- Producers: Scum; ThankGod4Cody; Carter Lang; Declan Miers; Solomonophonic; Michael Uzowuru

Audio
- "Diamond Boy (DTM)" on YouTube

"Diamond Boy (DTM)" is a song by American singer-songwriter SZA from SOS Deluxe: Lana (2024), the reissue of her second studio album SOS (2022). It is an R&B love song, with a musical structure that features a call and response technique. Each instrument is arranged intentionally around SZA's vocals, which are delivered softly and melodically. The instrumental consists of guitar plucks, drums, keyboards, and a sub-bass bassline. In the lyrics, the narrator seductively expresses her passionate devotion to a lover, whom she compares to a shiny diamond. She invites him to be physically intimate, though she asks him if she is "doing too much".

"Diamond Boy (DTM)" is the fourth track of Lana, released on December 20, 2024. The song peaked at number 60 on the US Billboard Hot 100 chart. Over a year before its release, it was previewed in the outro for the music video of the single "Snooze". A few critics wrote positively about the song in reviews of Lana, praising it for its production and the lyrics' relatability. Before its official release, SZA performed "Diamond Boy (DTM)" multiple times from 2023 to 2024. She played it in full for the first time in 2025, during her co-headlining Grand National Tour with rapper Kendrick Lamar.

== Background ==
SZA first announced a deluxe edition of her second studio album, SOS (2022), upon the album's release. She continued to reveal more details about it in 2023. In August, she told Variety that the tracklist would consist of scrapped outtakes, along with post-album tracks. SZA also announced that the deluxe edition had expanded into a bigger project akin to a "whole 'nother" album. She called it Lana.

The music video for the sixth SOS single, "Snooze", premiered in August 2023. SZA teased the video a few weeks prior, posting two behind-the-scenes clips on social media that included some unreleased music. A snippet of the same song appeared again in the video's outro. In doing so, SZA continued her tradition of previewing upcoming projects at the end of music videos.

Following the premiere, fans and publications began calling the unreleased song "OD" and "Diamond Boy". When SZA went on an interview with Rolling Stone some days later, she revealed that its official title was "DTM". In the interview, she said the song would appear on Lana. Before the reissue's release, unofficial versions of the full song were uploaded and circulated on YouTube.

== Music and production ==
"Diamond Boy (DTM)" (2024)
"Diamond Boy (DTM)" employs a call-and response musical structure. It is an R&B song, and its instruments consist of guitars, bass, drums, and keyboards.

Work on "Diamond Boy (DTM)", one of Lana's post-SOS tracks, started in mid-2023. Its making was prompted by a sudden burst of creativity, which SZA said was a sporadic occurrence during the recording period. The first demo was acoustic – it featured guitars, a bassline, soft vocals, and a rap freestyle. After SZA recorded the demo, she sent it to Carter Lang, one of her producers and frequent collaborators. His contributions primarily were adding more instruments for the final product: drums and keyboards. Other producers who helped with the song were Tyran Donaldson, ThankGod4Cody, Declan Miers, Solomonophonic, and Michael Uzowuru. "Diamond Boy (DTM)" was finished around August, about a week after SZA first teased the song online.

"Diamond Boy (DTM)" is an R&B song, with a soundscape that Pitchfork's Shaad D'Souza described as "sprawling". The musical structure prominently features a technique known as a call and response. In a call and response, the production is built around the main vocals, as if answering the singer. The idea to incorporate the technique came from Lang, who intentionally arranged each instrument to complement SZA's performance. These instruments – the plucked guitars, sub-bass bassline, drums, and keyboards – serve as the "response" to SZA's soft and melodic vocals, which is the "call". The song's final verse features the aforementioned rap freestyle; an audio effect to make it sound filtered has been applied to it.

Certain lyrics and production elements from the demo versions, as heard in unofficial YouTube uploads, are absent from the final release. However, the officially released version remains largely consistent with the demos.

== Lyrics ==
"Diamond Boy (DTM)" is a love song. In her Rolling Stone interview, SZA said that it was the first love song she could remember writing about someone she "actively liked", which she did during the "thick of the romance". In terms of tone, the lyrics are seductive and sensual.

In "Diamond Boy (DTM)", the narrator expresses her passionate devotion to the subject of the song. She compares the subject, who is her love interest, to a shiny diamond. She tells him about how easily she fell in lust with him, compared to other men she met before. The narrator sings, "usually I can't let down my guard ... usually I make 'em work so hard", and cites his suave way of speaking as a reason why he is an exception. She invites the man to be physically intimate, telling him to "break [her] back" during sex. Two lines from the song read, "You make my thoughts stop / You make being me less hard"; the narrator tries to control her racing thoughts.

The narrator asks the subject that, should their romance happen, he should be communicative during the relationship. A question she asks during the song is if she is "doing too much"; the phrase is where the title's initialism "DTM" is derived. Her requests, however, are not fully acknowledged. In a track-by-track ranking for Billboard, Mackenzie Cummings-Grady wrote that the boy "seems unable to check all three boxes [be intimate, empathetic, and communicative], and instead fulfills one need at the expense of the others."

== Release ==
"Diamond Boy (DTM)" was going to be released as part of a single bundle for "Snooze". When an acoustic version of "Snooze" was recorded and released in September, the release of "Diamond Boy (DTM)", meant to be Lana's lead single, was postponed. In mid-March 2024, SZA teased another unreleased song from Lana via her Instagram account, posting a video of her in undergarments as she poses in front of a camping tent and sings the lyrics. In the comments, one fan asked about where "Diamond Boy (DTM)" was. SZA replied: "on the deluxe I'm bout to drop". Lana was released later that year, on December 20. Shortly after its release, "Diamond Boy (DTM)" debuted at its peak of number 60 on the US Billboard Hot 100 chart. The same happened on Hot R&B/Hip-Hop Songs, where it peaked at number 9. Elsewhere, it reached number 80 in Canada and 146 on the Billboard Global 200.

A few critics praised "Diamond Boy (DTM)" in their reviews of Lana. They wrote positively about its portrayal of dating and falling in love, saying that SZA's expression of her emotions was relatable. Cummings-Grady, who ranked "Diamond Boy (DTM)" as Lana's eighth-best song among its fifteen tracks, said: "[it] flexes SZA’s well-known ability to turn uncomfortable human experiences into compelling R&B ballads". Apart from the lyrics, Gabriel Bras Nevares of HotNewHipHop wrote the song was well-executed because of its catchiness and mellifluous sound. In his view, the composition made it as good as similar tracks from the standard SOS edition. Also reviewing for HotNewHipHop, Zachary Horvath praised the sensual atmosphere that the song's guitar sounds provided. He further wrote that the instrument complemented SZA's passionate lyrics well.

== Live performances ==
Before the song's release, SZA debuted "Diamond Boy (DTM)" live during an exclusive concert at the Brooklyn Navy Yard, which was held in celebration of SOS's success. She also included "Diamond Boy (DTM)" on set lists for some shows on the SOS Tour. Her performance of the song at Brooklyn's Barclays Center was featured on a video series on Apple TV+ that premiered on February 1, 2024.

SZA first performed the full version of "Diamond Boy (DTM)" in 2025, during her co-headlining Grand National Tour with rapper Kendrick Lamar. Concerts were divided into nine acts; SZA performed the song during the seventh.

== Credits ==
Adapted from Tidal

- Solána Rowe (SZA) – songwriting
- Tyran Donaldson (Scum) – songwriting, production
- Cody Fayne (ThankGod4Cody) – songwriting, production
- Carter Lang – songwriting, production
- Declan Miers – songwriting, production
- Jared Solomon (Solomonophonic) – songwriting, production
- Michael Uzowuru – songwriting, production, arrangement, programming
- Gibi Dos Santos – percussion
- Johnny May – strings
- Hector Castro – engineering, mixing
- Sean Matsukawa – engineering
- Tyler Page – engineering
- Tommy Turner – engineering
- Conner McFarland – assistant engineering
- Hayden Duncan – assistant engineering
- Jonathan Lopez Garcia – assistant engineering
- Caleb Laven – mixing
- Jon Castelli – mixing
- Dale Becker – mastering
- Adam Burt – assistant mastering
- Noah McCorkle – assistant mastering

== Charts ==
Chart performance for "Diamond Boy (DTM)"
Chart (2024–2025)	Peak position
Canada Hot 100 (Billboard)	80
Global 200 (Billboard)	146
UK Hip Hop/R&B (Official Charts)	39
US Billboard Hot 100	60
US Hot R&B/Hip-Hop Songs (Billboard)	9

== Certifications ==
Certifications for "Diamond Boy (DTM)"
Region	Certification	Certified units/sales
United States (RIAA)	Gold	500,000^{‡}
^{‡} Sales+streaming figures based on certification alone.
