= Take You Down =

Take You Down may refer to:

- "Take You Down" (Chris Brown song), 2008
- "Take You Down" (Illenium song), 2018
- "Take You Down" (SZA song), 2025

== See also ==
- "Take Me Down", a song by Alabama from Mountain Music
