= Drive (SZA song) =

Promotional single by SZA

from the album SOS Deluxe: Lana
- Released: December 20, 2024
- Genre: R&B
- Length: 3:05
- Label: Top Dawg; RCA
- Songwriters: Solána Rowe; Cody Fayne; William Lemos; Dallas Tamaira; Devin Abrams
- Producers: ThankGod4Cody; Billy Lemos; Dallas Tamaira; Devin Abrams

Music video
- "Drive" on YouTube

"Drive" is a song by American singer-songwriter SZA from SOS Deluxe: Lana (2024), the reissue of her second studio album, SOS (2022). It is an acoustic R&B ballad, backed solely by a guitar. Lyrically, it explores themes of solitude, escapism, and struggles with fame. In the song, SZA sings about going on a late-night drive to ease her anxious mind, and she also taunts adversaries jealous of her success. Her vocal delivery ranges from rapping to melodic singing, and the lyrics' tone varies from melancholic to braggadocious.

The song was released on December 20, 2024, by Top Dawg Entertainment and RCA Records as the reissue's promotional single. An accompanying music video, starring filmmaker Ben Stiller, premiered upon its release. "Drive" debuted within the top 10 of the US Hot R&B/Hip-Hop Songs chart, whereas on the all-genre Billboard Hot 100, it peaked at number 51. In reviews of Lana, critics wrote positively about "Drive", mainly due to the introspective lyrics; some called it an album highlight. The song was nominated for Best R&B at the 2025 MTV Video Music Awards.

== Background ==
SZA announced a deluxe edition of her second studio album, SOS (2022), on social media upon the album's release. She continued to reveal more details in 2023; in August, she told Variety that its tracklist would consist of scrapped songs alongside post-album tracks.

During promotion for SOS's sixth single "Snooze", SZA posted two behind-the-scenes clips of its music video on Instagram. Each snippet was set to unreleased music. One song had a yet-unknown name. Rolling Stone and Vibe reported on the lyrics; some lines read: "I keep pretending, everyone's as good as me… All my exes still love me / Call me up, he wanna freak." The lyrics are from the song "Drive", a track from SOS's reissue subtitled Lana (2024).

== Music and lyrics ==
"Drive" is an R&B song. It is backed by only one instrument, which is a softly played acoustic guitar. SZA's vocal delivery varies per verse, from freestyle-like rapping to melodic singing. Critics have described the song's sound as "chill", soulful, and restrained. "Drive" was produced by ThankGod4Cody, Billy Lemos, Dallas Tamaira, and Devin Abrams

The lyrics of "Drive", a sentimental ballad, explore feelings of loneliness, anguish, and sometimes hostility. Its themes include struggles with existential crises, the search for escapism, and alienation despite one's fame. Shaad D'Souza of Pitchfork described the song as metatextual, writing that it tackles many emotions present throughout Lana—like grandeur, insecurity, and anger—all in one track. Words of affirmation are present in the lyrics; SZA tells herself that to become more hopeful and loving, hatred must not distract her. She sings: "I can't succumb like these cum-guzzlers at all."

In terms of tone, "Drive" is both melancholic and aggressive. In the song, SZA sings about taking her mind off her problems by going on a late-night drive. She mentions her celebrity status as one source of her woes, saying that despite her success, she remains in solitude. She sings in the pre-chorus: "I been up 'til sunrise, headed to nowhere / Hopin' that someone's missin' me somewhere." At the same time, SZA also expresses braggadocio and self-assuredness; much of the first verse is her taunting adversaries jealous of her success. In one line, she boasts that her ex-boyfriends still love her.

== Release ==
After a long series of delays, SZA revealed the release date of Lana to be December 20, 2024. The announcement came with a teaser for the song; it stated that a music video for "Drive" was to premiere on the same day. The song was released at midnight EST, a few hours before Lana, as a Spotify-exclusive track. "Drive" peaked at number 51 on the US Billboard Hot 100 chart, and it debuted within the top 10 of Hot R&B/Hip-Hop Songs. On the Billboard Global 200, it peaked at number 122. In 2025, the song was nominated for Best R&B at that year's MTV Video Music Awards.

Many critics praised "Drive" in reviews of Lana. Some called it an album highlight, citing the song's introspective and ruminative lyrics. One such critic was Mackenzie Cummings-Grady of Billboard, who ranked "Drive" as the second-best track from Lana for the range of emotions present throughout the song. Another, Jem Aswad of Variety, praised "Drive" for providing the album with small "flashes of revenge and perseverance". D'Souza ended his review of Lana by writing: "SZA's music can feel claustrophobic at times simply because of how deeply it is rooted in her own thoughts. 'Drive,' on the other hand, feels infinite—the sound of total freedom."

Another point of commentary was the song's acoustic sound. For HotNewHipHop reviewer Gabriel Bras Nevares, its minimal production was elevated by the way SZA combined her lyrical singing with her switching rap flows. Cummings-Grady thought that a stripped-down production for "Drive" allowed her to seamlessly showcase her various personas. He listed them as follows: "her self-sufficient rapper, the sensitive empath, and the heartbroken loner still yearning for human connection."

== Music video ==
The music video was directed and edited by Bradley J. Calder. It features filmmaker Ben Stiller, co-director of the science fiction TV series Severance.

Throughout the video, his character drives an SUV on an empty road at night, lip syncing the song's lyrics and trying to stay awake. In a frantic state, he wildly shakes his head, performs a doughnut stunt, and sticks himself out of the window. As the song ends, he exits the car to "ghost ride the whip", or dance beside and around the vehicle. He returns to the car and drives away.

The camera then pans to a nearby SZA, who frolicks and crawls in a marsh by the roadside. She is dressed as a bug, a feat achieved through black body paint and a prosthetic mask. During the clip, a snippet of the Lana track "Crybaby" plays.

== Credits ==
Adapted from Tidal

- Solána Rowe (SZA) – lead vocals, songwriting
- Cody Fayne (ThankGod4Cody) – songwriting, production
- William Lemos (Billy Lemos) – songwriting, production
- Dallas Tamaira – songwriting, production
- Devin Abrams – songwriting, production
- Hector Castro – mixing
- Dale Becker – mastering
- Jacob Dennis – assistant engineering
- Jonathan Lopez Garcia – assistant engineering
- Kyle McAulay – assistant engineering
- Conner McFarland – assistant engineering
- Adam Burt – assistant mastering
- Noah McCorkle – assistant mastering
- Kegn Venegas – assistant mastering

== Charts ==
=== Weekly charts ===
Weekly chart performance for "Drive"
Chart (2024–2025)	Peak position
Canada Hot 100 (Billboard)	76
Global 200 (Billboard)	122
New Zealand Hot Singles (RMNZ)	6
Philippines (Philippines Hot 100)	93
UK Hip Hop/R&B (Official Charts)	26
US Billboard Hot 100	51
US Hot R&B/Hip-Hop Songs (Billboard)	8

=== Year-end charts ===
Year-end chart performance for "Drive"
Chart (2025)	Position
US Hot R&B/Hip-Hop Songs (Billboard)	95

== Certifications ==
Certifications for "Drive"
Region	Certification	Certified units/sales
United States (RIAA)	Gold	500,000^{‡}
^{‡} Sales+streaming figures based on certification alone.
