= 30 for 30 (song) =

Single by SZA and Kendrick Lamar

from the album SOS Deluxe: Lana
- Released: January 7, 2025
- Genre: Hip-hop; trap; R&B
- Length: 4:38
- Label: Top Dawg; RCA
- Songwriters: Solána Rowe; Kendrick Lamar Duckworth; Bobby DeBarge; Greg Williams; Anthony Jermaine White; Michael Uzowuru
- Producers: J. White Did It; Michael Uzowuru

SZA singles chronology
| "Luther" (2024) | "30 for 30" and "BMF" (2025) | "PT Cruiser" (2025) |

Kendrick Lamar singles chronology
| "Luther" (2024) | "30 for 30" (2025) | "Peekaboo" (2025) |

Audio
- "30 for 30" on YouTube

Audio sample
- file; help

"30 for 30" is a song by American singer-songwriter SZA and American rapper Kendrick Lamar. It was released on January 7, 2025, as a single from SOS Deluxe: Lana (2024), the reissue of SZA's 2022 album SOS. The song was written by both SZA and Lamar, along with Bobby DeBarge, Greg Williams, Anthony Jermaine White, and Michael Uzowuru while production was handled by the latter two. Critics noted that while Kendrick Lamar often adopts a softer tone in their collaborations, SZA delivers a more confident rap-singing performance here. It arrived a month after their previous two collaborations for Lamar's GNX, "Luther" and "Gloria".

== Background ==
Singer-songwriter SZA and rapper Kendrick Lamar are known for their longstanding work relationship. The two released their sixth and seventh collaborations as part of Lamar's sixth studio album, GNX, in November 2024. Their first song together was from back in 2014. (Note: Their first seven songs are "Babylon" (2014), "Easy Bake" (2015; with Jay Rock), "Untitled 04 | 08.14.2014" (2016), "Doves in the Wind" (2017), "All the Stars" (2018), and "Gloria" and "Luther" (2024).)

Shortly after GNX, and the announcement of its concert tour, speculation arose about more music from SZA by the end of 2024. She had been teasing the reissue of her 2022 album SOS, subtitled Lana, which media outlets believed would be released that year. Such rumors were confirmed on December 9, the second anniversary of SOS, when SZA shared a teaser for Lana accompanied with a countdown. She shared the full tracklist upon its release 10 days later, revealing a new collaboration with Lamar titled "30 for 30".

== Composition and lyrics ==
A more braggadocious piece within her discography, "30 for 30" allows SZA to "bask in her accomplishments" accentuated with "soaring strings and booming 808's". The song starts off with a spoken-word sample, taken from the R&B/funk band Switch song "I Call Your Name", with lead singer Bobby DeBarge admitting to indulging in "immature things" as well as "painful doubts and insecurities"; all of which SZA tries to leave behind as old patterns all the while being "candid" and "direct" about it.

Meanwhile, Lamar pokes fun at a former friend of SZA for asserting more femininity than she does. Listeners and critics alleged that lyrics on the song could be aimed at Canadian rapper Drake, who had been in a feud with Lamar for the majority of 2024, while the song title itself might be a reference to the former's 2015 song "30 for 30 Freestyle".

== Release and reception ==
The song was sent to radio stations alongside "BMF" as Lana's second and third singles on January 7, 2025. "30 for 30" debuted atop the US Hot R&B Songs chart, SZA's seventh and Lamar's second to do so. It entered the chart with 17.5 million streams, 2,000 downloads, and 385,000 people reached by airplay. With the debut, SZA broke the record for the most number-ones by a woman on the chart. On the all-genre Billboard Hot 100, "30 for 30" reached a new peak of number 10 following a joint performance by SZA and Lamar at the 2025 Super Bowl LIX halftime show despite not being part of the set list. This gave SZA her 12th top ten hit and Lamar his 23rd.

In a ranking of all tracks from Lana, Billboard writer Mackenzie Cummings-Grady placed "30 for 30" fourth, citing the song as another example of how both artists "bring out the best in each other". Cummings-Grady thought Lamar's "cocky" style effectively rubbed off on SZA and encouraged her to achieve her own "victory lap". Mya Abraham of Vibe called the song an immediate standout and obsession. To the writers of The Express Tribune, "30 for 30" is another installment of "their successful partnership" following the previous collaborations on GNX.

== Accolades ==
List of awards and nominations received by "30 for 30"
| Year | Award | Category | Result | Ref. |
|---|---|---|---|---|
| 2025 | BET Awards | Best Collaboration | Nominated | |
| 2026 | Grammy Awards | Best Pop Duo/Group Performance | Nominated | |

== Live performances ==
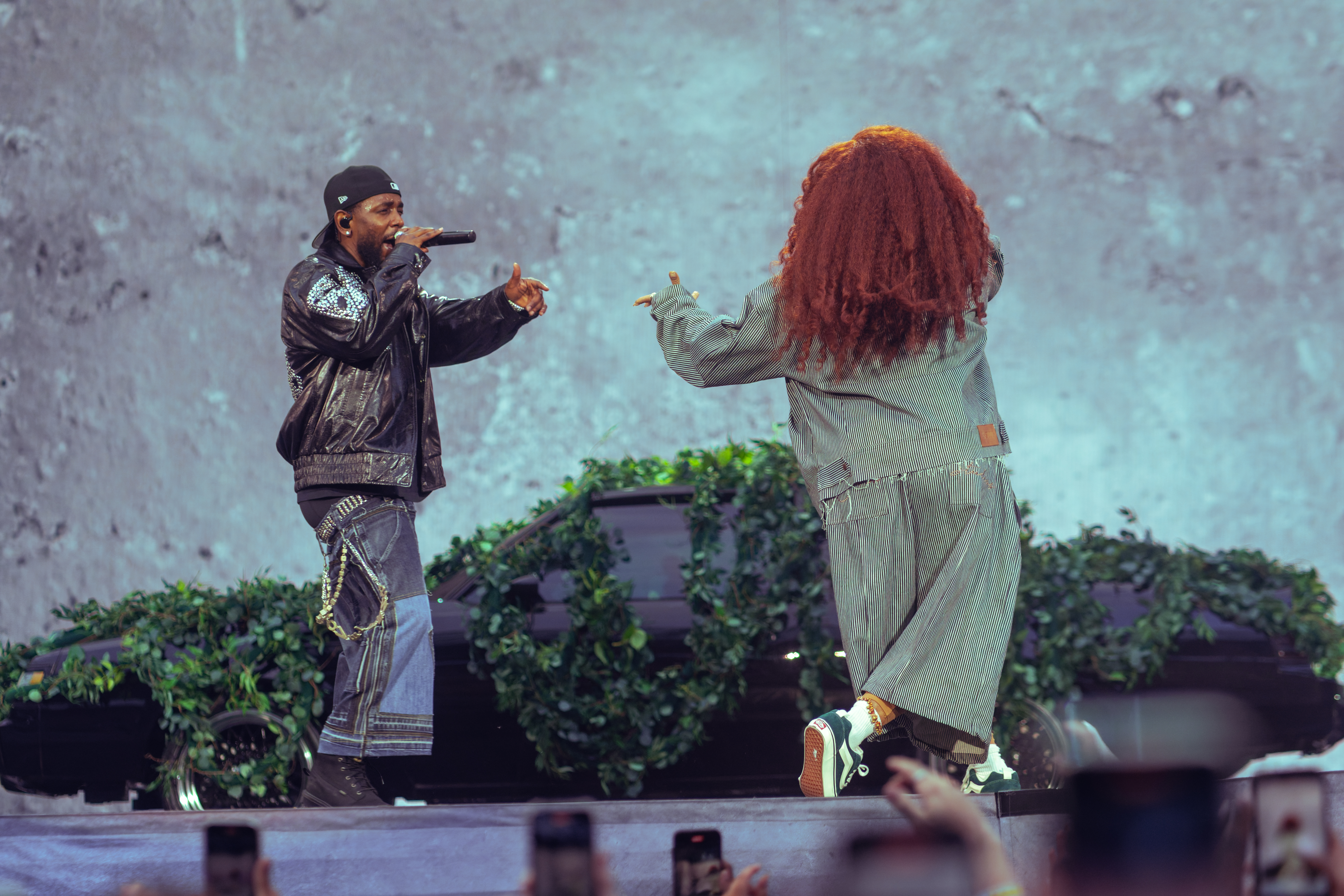
Kendrick Lamar and SZA performing "30 for 30" during the Grand National Tour (2025)

SZA and Lamar debuted "30 for 30" live in 2025, during their co-headlining Grand National Tour (2025). It was first performed in the Minneapolis concert. Appearing onstage for the second act, SZA began her set standing beside a GNX car that was overgrown with vines and leaves. She was dressed in earthy tones and a forest-inspired outfit, joined by dancers who moved in a graceful manner.

== Charts ==
=== Weekly charts ===
Weekly chart performance for "30 for 30"
| Chart (2024–2025) | Peak position |
|---|---|
| Australia (ARIA) | 39 |
| Australia Hip Hop/R&B (ARIA) | 9 |
| Canada Hot 100 (Billboard) | 31 |
| Global 200 (Billboard) | 27 |
| Greece International (IFPI) | 45 |
| Iceland (Tónlistinn) | 38 |
| Ireland (IRMA) | 55 |
| Japan Hot Overseas (Billboard Japan) | 9 |
| Lithuania (AGATA) | 93 |
| Lithuania Airplay (TopHit) | 93 |
| Malta Airplay (Radiomonitor) | 20 |
| New Zealand (Recorded Music NZ) | 22 |
| Philippines (Philippines Hot 100) | 35 |
| Sweden (Sverigetopplistan) | 96 |
| UK Singles (Official Charts) | 33 |
| UK Hip Hop/R&B (Official Charts) | 11 |
| US Billboard Hot 100 | 10 |
| US Adult Pop Airplay (Billboard) | 40 |
| US Hot R&B/Hip-Hop Songs (Billboard) | 4 |
| US R&B/Hip-Hop Airplay (Billboard) | 4 |
| US Pop Airplay (Billboard) | 10 |
| US Rhythmic Airplay (Billboard) | 1 |

=== Year-end charts ===
Year-end chart performance for "30 for 30"
| Chart (2025) | Position |
|---|---|
| Canada (Canadian Hot 100) | 96 |
| Global 200 (Billboard) | 155 |
| US Billboard Hot 100 | 21 |
| US Hot R&B/Hip-Hop Songs (Billboard) | 4 |
| US R&B/Hip-Hop Airplay (Billboard) | 4 |
| US Pop Airplay (Billboard) | 38 |
| US Rhythmic Airplay (Billboard) | 8 |

== Certifications ==
Certifications for "30 for 30"
| Region | Certification | Certified units/sales |
|---|---|---|
| Canada (Music Canada) | Platinum | 80,000^{‡} |
| New Zealand (RMNZ) | Platinum | 30,000^{‡} |
| United Kingdom (BPI) | Silver | 200,000^{‡} |
| United States (RIAA) | 2× Platinum | 2,000,000^{‡} |
^{‡} Sales+streaming figures based on certification alone.

== Release history ==
Release dates and formats for "30 for 30"
| Region | Date | Format(s) | Labels | Ref. |
|---|---|---|---|---|
| United States | January 7, 2025 | Rhythmic contemporary radio | Top Dawg; RCA | |
| Italy | July 11, 2025 | Radio airplay | Sony Italy | |
