= Crybaby (SZA song) =

Song by SZA

from the album SOS Deluxe: Lana
- Released: December 20, 2024
- Length: 4:02
- Label: Top Dawg; RCA
- Songwriters: Solána Rowe; Carter Lang; Cody Fayne; Declan Miers; Daniel Abraham Jr.; Hannah Wardell; Michael Uzowuru
- Producers: Carter Lang; ThankGod4Cody; Declan Miers; Daniel Abraham Jr.; Hands; Michael Uzowuru

Audio
- "Crybaby" on YouTube

"Crybaby" is a song by American singer-songwriter SZA from SOS Deluxe: Lana (2024), the reissue of her second studio album SOS (2022). Musically, it is a ballad whose instrumentation combines strings, twinkly synthesizers, and a groovy and heavy bassline. Lyrically, it explores themes of negative public perception and accountability. In the song, SZA sings about how the struggles of celebrity has made her emotionally vulnerable, which she thinks has made people view her awfully. She also reminds herself to hold herself responsible for any self-destructive behavior. Near the end, she accepts her imperfections and embraces the negative narratives people say about her.

The song was released on December 20, 2024, by Top Dawg Entertainment and RCA Records. Before its release, it was previewed in the music video for a separate Lana track and an album teaser shown in two concerts. "Crybaby" debuted within the top 15 of the US Hot R&B/Hip-Hop Songs chart, and on the all-genre Billboard Hot 100, it peaked at number 70. Several critics praised the song in reviews of Lana; some considered it an album highlight. Many praised the vocal performance, as well as the lyrics' confessional nature and emotional impact. SZA debuted "Crybaby" live on the Grand National Tour (2025), performing it with a long dress that slowly stretched to resemble a butterfly cocoon.

== Background ==
SZA teased a deluxe edition of her second studio album, SOS (2022), immediately upon its release. She shared more details about the deluxe edition in 2023; in a September concert, she revealed that it became a reissue which she titled Lana. She first teased the reissue's visuals via Instagram on May 31, 2024. In a post on the platform, she shared a costume of herself as an insect.

When SZA performed at BST Hyde Park concert in June, several insect props were present onstage. During the set, she played a video that featured her in another bug costume. Set to a song publications named "Storytime", the clip was shared again on social media after the show. The same song was previewed at her Lollapalooza 2024 set on August 3, during which she announced its official name was "Crybaby".

== Music and lyrics ==
"Crybaby" is a song backed by strings, twinkly synthesizers, and groovy bass. It has a soundscape that DeAsia Paige of Elle writes as being rosy; Shaad D'Souza of Pitchfork describes it as being that of a "gorgeous [and] sunkissed" ballad. SZA's vocal performance is lilting (rhythmic, animated, and quick), reaching a soprano high for the final verse. The song's bassline is heavy, which often overpowers her voice.

"Crybaby" explores various themes, including SZA's worries about her public perception. She sings, in the first verse, how the pressure from being a public figure has contributed to her reputation as being emotionally sensitive. Acknowledging the narrative, she responds that she has grown tired of her attitude as well: "I'm so sick of me too".

Another theme the lyrics explore is accountability. In the song, SZA laments her continued inability to hold herself responsible for her life's mistakes, instead having chosen the world to blame. She also ruminates—a "raw and gut-wrenching look in the mirror", as described by Billboard's Mackenzie Cummings-Grady—on how she lets her insecurities lead to self-destructive behavior like smoking. Eventually, she learns to take accountability and acknowledge her flaws. She reminds herself to "stop smokin' them Backwoods so [she] can age backwards", move her emotional instability "to the backseat", and cut the negative thoughts that are "blocking the positive".

The lyrics see SZA embrace her insecurities and flaws as well, an act of self-love. In an inversion of the first verse, where she worries that the public perceives her negatively for being emotional, she sings in the last verse: "I know you told stories about me / Most of them awful, all of them true."

== Release and reception ==
"Crybaby" is the 10th track of Lana, released on December 20, 2024. Shortly before its release, SZA premiered a music video for the track "Drive", where a snippet of "Crybaby" plays at the end. In the outro, the camera pans to SZA, wearing bug-eye prosthetics, as she moves around some grass by the roadside. "Crybaby" peaked at number 70 on the US Billboard Hot 100 chart, and it debuted within the top 15 of Hot R&B/Hip-Hop Songs. On the Billboard Global 200, it peaked at number 196. Elsewhere, the song reached peaks of number 93 in Canada and number 99 in the Philippines.

Several critics praised "Crybaby" in reviews of Lana. Many commended the songwriting's confessional nature, as well as its emotional impact. Cummings-Grady of Billboard cited it as a reason why the song was, in his view, Lana's best track: "[it] is a powerful tale [that] will turn anyone into a crybaby". Writing in Elle, Paige DeAsia said, "Crybaby" was an example of SZA demonstrating one of her lyrics' biggest strengths, which was the expression of one's shameful feelings in a brutally honest way. She added that with the song, she proved "her lyrical mastery [was] just as effective when she's more assertive" with self-improvement. Its authenticity was the point of praise for Shaad D'Souza, who wrote in Pitchfork, that it did not feel performative and shallow in the way other artists try to express it.

D'Souza also was one of many reviewers who praised the song's composition. Another, Variety's Jem Aswad, considered "Crybaby" an album highlight because of SZA's voice. Gabriel Bras Nevares, for HotNewHipHop, said that the song showcased her "best and most dynamic vocal performances and emotional narratives".

== Live performances ==
Following the live debut of the "Crybaby" snippets, SZA performed the song in full for the first time in 2025. She included it on the set list of the Grand National Tour, co-headlined by rapper Kendrick Lamar. Concerts were divided into nine acts; SZA performed the song during the seventh. She sang "Crybaby" right before "Saturn", wearing a long dress that slowly stretched to resemble a cocoon as she ascended atop the stage. Upon completing her performance, the dress was removed to reveal a pair of butterfly wings.

== Credits ==
Adapted from Tidal

- Solána Rowe (SZA) – songwriting
- Daniel Abraham Jr. – songwriting, production
- Cody Fayne (ThankGod4Cody) – songwriting, production
- Carter Lang – songwriting, production
- Declan Miers – songwriting, production
- Michael Uzowuru – songwriting, production, miscellaneous production
- Hannah Wardell (Hands) – songwriting, production
- Johnny May – strings
- Brittney Orinda – engineering
- Sean Matsukawa – engineering
- Tommy Turner – assistant engineering
- Hector Castro – mixing
- Dale Becker – mastering
- Adam Burt – assistant mastering
- Noah McCorkle – assistant mastering

== Charts ==
Chart performance for "Crybaby"
Chart (2024–2025)	Peak position
Canada Hot 100 (Billboard)	93
Global 200 (Billboard)	196
Philippines (Philippines Hot 100)	99
US Billboard Hot 100	70
US Hot R&B/Hip-Hop Songs (Billboard)	13

== Certifications ==
Certifications for "Crybaby"
Region	Certification	Certified units/sales
United States (RIAA)	Gold	500,000^{‡}
^{‡} Sales+streaming figures based on certification alone.
