= PT Cruiser (song) =

2025 single by Moruf featuring SZA

Single by Moruf featuring SZA

from the album Moolodic: Hotep Luxury
- Released: October 15, 2025
- Studio: Peach Tree (Los Angeles)
- Genre: Hip-hop; R&B
- Length: 3:44
- Label: Integral
- Songwriters: Moruf Adewunmi; Solána Rowe
- Producers: Jesse Boykins III; Nate Bajar; MeLo-X; Aspene Taylor; Matt Cody

Moruf singles chronology
"Everybody Raps" (2025)	"PT Cruiser" (2025)

SZA singles chronology
"BMF" and "30 for 30" (2025)	"PT Cruiser" (2025)	"Girl, Get Up" (2025)

Music video
- "PT Cruiser" on YouTube

"PT Cruiser" is a song by Nigerian-American rapper Moruf featuring American singer-songwriter SZA. It was released on October 15, 2025, as the second single from Moruf's album Moolodic: Hotep Luxury. by Integral Records. A hip-hop and R&B song, "PT Cruiser" combines a smooth and groovy instrumental with vocals that alternate between singing and rapping.

The song was influenced in part by Moruf and SZA's decade-long friendship; its nostalgic lyrics are about falling in love as a child. Moruf sings about spending time with a former love interest on the backseat of her mother's PT Cruiser, and SZA references her high school pastime of improvising car freestyles with Moruf on her mother's house's driveway.

== Background ==
Moruf and SZA have known each other for over a decade prior to the song's release. They first met in their home state of New Jersey back when SZA was in high school. The two were introduced to each other by her mother, who was already acquainted with Moruf. He and SZA became friends after he gave her the link to his Facebook account.

Moruf spent much of his time with SZA at her mother's house. The two liked to perform freestyle raps on the driveway, a pastime SZA credits with inspiring her to start a career in music. She wrote on an Instagram post about the song's release that "[w]ithout our car freestyles in my mom's driveway there'd be no me!"

== Music and lyrics ==
"PT Cruiser" is a hip-hop and R&B song. It is characterized by a smooth R&B timbre, a pulsing groove, and verses that alternate between singing and rapping. It was recorded in Peach Tree Studio in Los Angeles and produced by Jesse Boykins III, Nate Bajar, MeLo-X, Aspene Taylor, and Matt Cody. SZA wrote her verse in under one hour.

"PT Cruiser" is about childhood memories and young love. It has a nostalgic tone, influenced in part by Moruf and SZA's longtime friendship. In the hook, Moruf reminisces about spending time with a former love interest on "the backseat of your momma PT Cruiser". SZA raps in her verse, "I just chill and rap to the beat / Let them other bitches chase the meat / I don't know the taste of defeat / Find my way, find my way", referencing her driveway freestyles with Moruf as a high schooler.

== Release ==
"PT Cruiser" was released on October 15, 2025, by Integral Records. It was accompanied by a music video directed by Joshua Kissi. The video is similarly nostalgic in tone; it is shot in a soft color palette and features scenes of Moruf and SZA together alongside vignettes of young children and teenagers.

The song was reviewed on HotNewHipHop by editor-in-chief Alexander Cole. He praised "PT Cruiser" for its "silky smooth" production, and he complimented Moruf for his vocal performance. Cole wrote that by collaborating with high-profile peers like SZA, Moruf is "prov[ing] that his future is very bright".
