= Scorsese Baby Daddy =

Song by SZA

from the album SOS Deluxe: Lana
- Released: December 20, 2024
- Genre: Psychedelic rock
- Length: 2:33
- Label: Top Dawg; RCA
- Songwriters: Solána Rowe; Tyler Johnson; Michael Uzowuru
- Producers: Tyler Johnson; Michael Uzowuru

Audio
- "Scorsese Baby Daddy" on YouTube

"Scorsese Baby Daddy" is a song by American singer-songwriter SZA from SOS Deluxe: Lana (2024), the reissue of her second studio album SOS (2022). It is a psychedelic rock song, incorporating a groovy guitar rhythm and elements of soul music. Its title references Martin Scorsese, a filmmaker and director. In the lyrics, SZA expresses her desire to find a boyfriend who reminds her of the characters from Scorsese's filmography, who tend to be violent criminals.

The song was released on December 20, 2024. Shortly after, Scorsese's daughter Francesca showed the song to him, to which he expressed his subtle approval; SZA saw his reaction on social media and responded positively. In reviews of Lana, some critics wrote favorably about "Scorsese Baby Daddy" and focused on the lyrics' humorous and lighthearted tone. More critical reviewers commented on the music, deeming the production too short or generic.

== Background ==
SZA first teased a deluxe version of her second studio album, SOS (2022), on an Instagram post shared immediately after the album's release. In a 2023 invite-only concert, she announced that the deluxe edition had expanded into a bigger project akin to a "whole 'nother" album. SZA named it Lana.

On December 6, 2024, SZA shared a picture of a whiteboard that contained titles of possible tracks from the reissue. All names were obscured, except for the already-released lead single "Saturn". The full track list was revealed two weeks later, upon Lana's release. One of the songs is named "Scorsese Baby Daddy", a reference to filmmaker and director Martin Scorsese.

== Music and lyrics ==
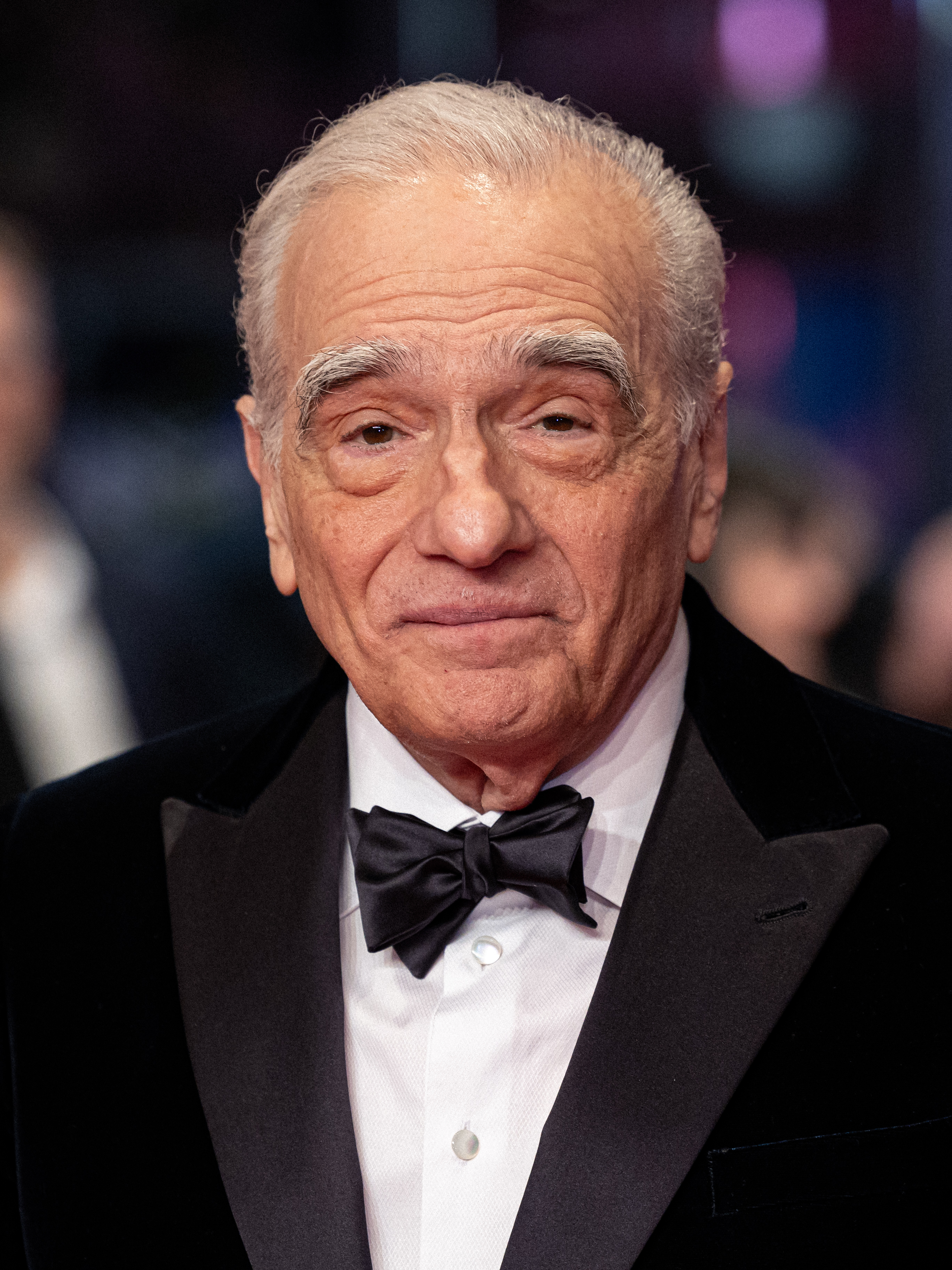
Martin Scorsese in 2024

"Scorsese Baby Daddy" is a psychedelic rock song, containing a groovy guitar rhythm and elements of soul music. Rob Sheffield of Rolling Stone describes the composition as "steamy Eighties-style cheese-rock", whereas Craig Jenkins of Vulture writes that it recalls the "shouty, washed-out abandon of 2010s indie rock". Adding to his description, Jenkins notes that fervent fans of singer-songwriter Melanie Martinez compare the song's musical style to that of her 2023 album Portals (2023). "Scorsese Baby Daddy" was written by SZA alongside its producers Tyler Johnson and Michael Uzowuru. SZA's vocal performance is melodic, and her loudness occasionally overpowers that of the instrumental.

The lyrics are about wanting a boyfriend whose personality is similar to that of various men from Scorsese's filmography. SZA alludes to a specific character archetype present throughout his films: emotionally unstable or violent criminals. Matt Mitchell of Paste cited Travis Bickle from Taxi Driver (1976) and Max Cady from Cape Fear (1991) as examples. Depicting herself as a danger-loving woman, SZA sings that she is addicted to the drama that comes with having a boyfriend similar to such characters. She fantasizes about having children with him: "I would pretend to do my favorite man, he'd call me tasty ... Period’s late again, I wonder if I cooked a baby."

Whether or not SZA should control her base urges is also explored in the song. In some lines, she decides to let her emotional instability and recklessness consume her: "I could've called my mom up / I'd rather f*ck about it." She sings about rolling up and smoking a cigarette to destress from her problems. SZA tells the subject of the song that she is about to "crash out", an African American Vernacular English phrase that means to have a mental breakdown, and to not stop her from doing so. In other lyrics, she considers changing her possibly self-destructive behavior, saying "one day, I'll understand all that it takes to be a lady."

== Release ==
"Scorsese Baby Daddy" is the sixth track of Lana, released on December 20, 2024. A day later, Scorsese's daughter Francesca used the song's audio on a video she posted on Instagram. In the video was Scorsese himself, subtly expressing his approval of the song. Shocked that he reacted to it so soon, SZA reposted the video—captioned with a sobbing emoji—and wrote "the fact that this [video] isn't AI, and it is actually Martin Scorsese". SZA had teased a music video for the track. It ended up being scrapped by SZA, explaining that the concept of the video "scares" her. She eventually posted a snippet of it on July 10th, 2026. It shows SZA, dressed up as her bug-like hybrid character from the album cover, dancing in a aerobics get-up in a aerobics studio alongside numerous other bug-like hybrids wearing the same get-up, as well as her sensually straddling her love interest's waist on the floor.

"Scorsese Baby Daddy" peaked at number 41 on the US Billboard Hot 100 chart. Elsewhere, the song reached peaks of number 66 in Canada, 67 in Ireland, and 75 in the UK. On the Billboard Global 200, it peaked at number 140.

== Critical reception ==
Some reviewers wrote positively about "Scorsese Baby Daddy". Among those was Sheffield, who called the song an album highlight. Zachary Horvath of HotNewHipHop praised the composition, writing that "Scorsese Baby Daddy" improved upon the conventional "angsty teen pop" sound. Referring to the lyrics' expression of love for drama, Horvath praised SZA's sense of humor in the song. Journalists Cyclone Wehner of NME and DeAsia Paige of Elle also commended the humor.

Other reviewers, like Mackenzie Cummings-Grady of Billboard and Jem Aswad of Variety, were more critical of the song. The former, who ranked "Scorsese Baby Daddy" the 12th-best track out of Lana's 15, thought that its length was too short. For Aswad, the song did not feel "fully realized". In contrast to Horvath, fellow HotNewHipHop reviewer Gabriel Bras Nevares thought the rock production felt too generic and was carried only by SZA's melodic vocals.

"Scorsese Baby Daddy" was ranked at number 12 on Paste's top 100 best songs of 2025. For the entry, Mitchell wrote that while most of the tracks on Lana did not improve upon SOS, "Scorsese Baby Daddy" was an exception. He praised the lyrics as being some of SZA's best since Ctrl in 2017 and her vocals as one of the best he's heard for all of 2025.

== Live performances ==
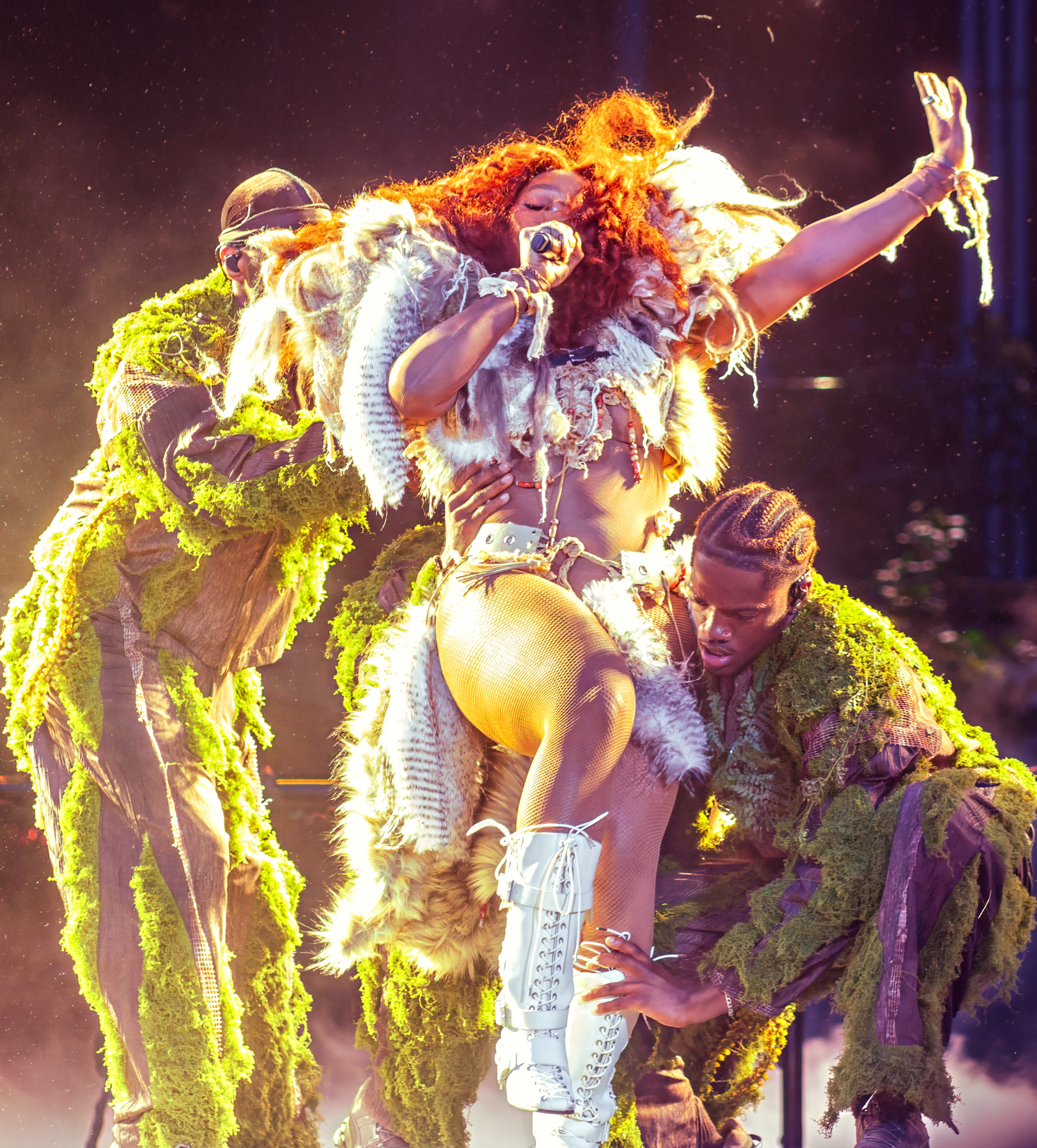
SZA performing "Scorsese Baby Daddy" on the Grand National Tour in London

SZA debuted "Scorsese Baby Daddy" live in April 2025. She first performed it in Minneapolis as part of her co-headlining Grand National Tour (2025) with rapper Kendrick Lamar. Concerts were divided into nine acts; SZA performed the song during the fourth, atop a stage with a forest-themed aesthetic.

== Credits ==
Adapted from Tidal

- Solána Rowe (SZA) – songwriting
- Tyler Johnson – songwriting, production
- Michael Uzowuru – songwriting, production, programming
- Tyler Page – additional production, engineering
- Owen Stoutt – additional production, engineering
- Hector Castro – engineering
- Sean Matsukawa – engineering
- Brittney Orinda – engineering
- Daniel Escobar – assistant engineering
- Kyle McAulay – assistant engineering
- Tommy Turner – assistant engineering
- Mark "Spike" Stent – mixing
- Dale Becker – mastering
- Adam Burt – assistant mastering
- Noah McCorkle – assistant mastering

== Charts ==
Chart performance for "Scorsese Baby Daddy"
Chart (2024–2025)	Peak position
Canada Hot 100 (Billboard)	66
Global 200 (Billboard)	140
Ireland (IRMA)	67
UK Singles (Official Charts)	75
UK Hip Hop/R&B (Official Charts)	31
US Billboard Hot 100	41

== Certifications ==
Certifications for "Scorsese Baby Daddy"
Region	Certification	Certified units/sales
United States (RIAA)	Gold	500,000^{‡}
^{‡} Sales+streaming figures based on certification alone.
