= Tyran Donaldson =

American songwriter, producer, multi-instrumentalist (born 1994)

Tyran Levon Donaldson Jr.
- Born: August 1, 1994 (age 32); Chattanooga, Tennessee, United States
- Other names: Scum, The Antydote, Pete Nebula
- Musical career
- Genres: R&B; hip-hop; indie rock; soul
- Occupations: Songwriter; producer; multi-instrumentalist
- Label: Top Dawg Entertainment

Tyran Donaldson II, also known as Scum, Pete Nebula and The Antydote, is an American songwriter, producer and multi-instrumentalist best known for his work with Rihanna ("Consideration"), SZA ("Love Galore"), Kendrick Lamar ("Complexion (A Zulu Love)"), and Isaiah Rashad ("Rope // rosegold"), among many others. He is currently an in-house producer for label Top Dawg Entertainment.

Donaldson, a novice guitarist and early music industry friend of fellow producer ThankGod4Cody, began playing several melancholy guitar chords while in the studio with SZA, who requested a looped recording of the chords at the conclusion of the studio session. This loop would become the soundscape for 2017 Ctrl album opener "Supermodel", later Grammy-nominated for Best R&B Song.

== Discography ==
Credits are courtesy of Discogs, Tidal, Spotify, and AllMusic.

=== Executive-produced/co-written projects ===
Albums with ~ 50% Tyran Donaldson production/songwriting credits or more
Album	Artist	Year	Label
Thank You	Mike D	2026	Capitol Records

=== Songwriting and production credits ===
Title	Year	Artist	Album
"Part III"	2013	Isaiah Rashad	Welcome to the Game/Pieces of a Kid
"Hurt Cobaine"	2013	Isaiah Rashad	Welcome to the Game/Pieces of a Kid
"Mani Lux"	2013	Isaiah Rashad	Welcome to the Game/Pieces of a Kid
"Ronnie Drake" (Featuring SZA)	2014	Isaiah Rashad	Cilvia Demo
"West Savannah" (Featuring SZA)	2014	Isaiah Rashad	Cilvia Demo
"Banana"	2014	Isaiah Rashad	Cilvia Demo
"Shot You Down (Remix)" (Featuring Schoolboy Q & Jay Rock)	2014	Isaiah Rashad	Cilvia Demo
"Warm Winds" (With Isaiah Rashad)	2014	SZA	Z (EP)
"Cuban Pete" (Featuring SZA)	2014	Willow Smith	Non-album single
"Complexion (A Zulu Love)" (Featuring Rapsody)	2015	Kendrick Lamar	To Pimp a Butterfly
"Easy Bake" (Featuring Kendrick Lamar & SZA)	2015	Jay Rock	90059
"Wanna Ride" (Featuring Isaiah Rashad)	2015	Jay Rock	90059
"Consideration" (Featuring SZA)	2016	Rihanna	Anti
"Rope // rosegold" (Featuring SiR)	2016	Isaiah Rashad	The Sun's Tirade
"Don't Matter"	2016	Isaiah Rashad	The Sun's Tirade
"Portishead in the Morning" / / / "HER World"	2016	Ab-Soul	Do What Thou Wilt.
"Untitled" (Featuring Isaiah Rashad)	2016	GoldLink	Non-album single
"Supermodel"	2017	SZA	Ctrl
"Love Galore" (Featuring Travis Scott)	2017	SZA	Ctrl
"Drew Barrymore"	2017	SZA	Ctrl
"Prom"	2017	SZA	Ctrl
"Go Gina"	2017	SZA	Ctrl
"Anything"	2017	SZA	Ctrl
"Normal Girl"	2017	SZA	Ctrl
"Pretty Birds" (Featuring Isaiah Rashad)	2017	SZA	Ctrl
"20 Something"	2017	SZA	Ctrl
"Heaven's Gate"	2018	James Fauntleroy	Dying From Crying (Shelved)
"Blue Moon"	2019	EarthGang	Mirrorland
"Wires In The Way"	2019	SiR	Chasing Summer
"Afraid to Fall"	2019	Tayla Parx	We Need to Talk
"Read Your Mind" (Featuring Duckwrth)	2019	Tayla Parx	We Need to Talk
"Tomboys Have Feelings Too (Interlude)"	2019	Tayla Parx	We Need to Talk
"Static"	2020	Knox Fortune	Stock Child Wonder
"HB2U"	2021	Isaiah Rashad	The House Is Burning
"What About Heaven"	2021	Mustafa the Poet	When Smoke Rises
"Love Galore (Alt Version)"	2022	SZA	Ctrl (Deluxe)
"2 AM"	2022	SZA	Ctrl (Deluxe)
"Miles"	2022	SZA	Ctrl (Deluxe)
"Percolator"	2022	SZA	Ctrl (Deluxe)
"Seek & Destroy"	2022	SZA	SOS
"Far"	2022	SZA	SOS
"Diamond Boy (DTM)"	2024	SZA	Lana
"Supaficial"	2026	Isaiah Rashad	It's Been Awful

== Awards and nominations ==
Year	Ceremony	Award	Result	Ref
2018	60th Annual Grammy Awards	Grammy Award for Best R&B Song ("Supermodel")	Nominated	
