= SOS Deluxe: Lana =

2024 reissue studio album by SZA

Studio album (reissue) by SZA
- Released: December 20, 2024; February 9, 2025 (extended)
- Genre: R&B
- Length: 55:22
- Labels: Top Dawg; RCA
- Producers: Devin Abrams; Rob Bisel; Benny Blanco; Cade; Calvin Dickinson; Cashmere Cat; Omer Fedi; Iseeyou; Julian Friedl; J. White Did It; Tyler Johnson; Carter Lang; Lil Yachty; Nick Kobe; Nick Lee; Billy Lemos; Declan Miers; Hands; Daniel Abraham Jr.; Monsune; Sad Pony; Scum; Blake Slatkin; Solomonophonic; Dallas Tamaira; ThankGod4Cody; Michael Uzowuru

SZA chronology
SOS (2022)	SOS Deluxe: Lana (2024)

Singles from Lana
- 1. "Saturn" Released: February 22, 2024; 2. "BMF" Released: January 7, 2025; 3. "30 for 30" Released: January 7, 2025

SOS Deluxe: Lana is the reissue of SOS (2022), the second studio album by American singer-songwriter SZA. It was released on December 20, 2024, through Top Dawg Entertainment and RCA Records. It features guest appearances from Kendrick Lamar and Don Toliver. The album consists of 19 tracks, including the singles "Saturn", "BMF", and "30 for 30". To promote the album, SZA embarked on the co-headlining Grand National Tour with Lamar.

== Background ==
Soon after the release of her highly acclaimed and commercially successful second studio album, SOS (2022), SZA began teasing a deluxe edition with a postscript at the end of an Instagram post, where she thanked everyone who helped make the album possible. Reportedly composing the tracklist were ten songs intended for the standard edition, per the information SZA told Most Requested Live in January 2023 and Billboard in February. Later in September, she revealed Lana as the deluxe album's title.

Snippets of several songs from the SOS sessions, like the SoundCloud-release "Joni" (2021), had been on the Internet for years prior to the announcement. Despite persistent calls from SZA and her fans to include certain highly awaited outtakes on the album, her record label's president, Punch, disagreed. This led to SZA's decision to put them on Lana instead. Sometime after, she added to the tentative tracklist some songs that were recorded post-SOS. One was the 2023-recorded "Diamond Boy (DTM)".

== Production and recording ==
SZA wrote and recorded over 100 songs for SOS within a timespan of five years. She and her collaborator, album producer Carter Lang, continued to make music after its release specifically for Lana, motivated by sporadic bursts of creativity. By February 4, 2024, the day of the 2024 Grammy Awards, SZA told The Hollywood Reporter that the album was still "shaping itself" as she let her voice follow "whatever the [album]'s frequency [was]", though she refused to disclose more details. She reasoned that doing so would inadvertently change her creative direction for the album.

== Lyrics and themes ==
=== Themes ===
I'm not identifying with my brokenness ...Yeah, I experienced cruelty. I have to put it down at some point. Piece by piece, my music is shifting because of that, the lighter I get.

— SZA, December 2024 issue of British Vogue

Rolling Stone's Rob Sheffield described Lana as a story about change, in which SZA ventures to break toxic habits and overcome her worst insecurities. During recording sessions for the reissue, SZA felt that her mental well-being had improved since the making of SOS. She told British Vogue that the change was reflected in her songwriting, saying that she had been healing from others' cruelty. Critics who reviewed Lana wrote that it portrays SZA in a transformative state of being, caught in several inner conflicts that hinder her self-improvement.

Many of the reissue's themes and narratives are similar to the ones present in SOS. However, there are multiple deviations. Reviewing the reissue for Vulture, Craig Jenkins wrote that the 19 new songs constituted "a DLC pack of more stories from the same journey to self-love captured in SOS." Pearce disagreed; he argued that Lana "doesn't feel like the same journey" because SZA took a different approach in conceptualizing the reissue. Sheffield wrote that Lana marks the evolution of SZA's songwriting into one that is more direct, ambitious, and aggressive in tone.

=== Songs ===
The songs on Lana explore themes of seeking closure, ruminating over and forgiving past mistakes, and developing a fulfilling self-concept. The album opens with "No More Hiding", in which she declares she wants to be her real self, ugly as it might be. She ends an unhealthy romantic relationship and reaffirms her independence: "I wanna feel sun on my skin / Even if it burns or blinds me / I wanna be purified within."

Love and sexuality are commonly explored topics on Lana. Several tracks range from lighthearted songs about falling in love, to more ruminative ones that chronicle devastating breakups.Erotic love songs contain declarations of romantic and sexual attraction to an ideal man, as well as the desire to pursue him. One such song is "BMF"; the object of affection is a "young and fine and dark and handsome" boy whose beauty makes SZA want to remove her underwear. For the album's more melancholic tracks, SZA explores the vulnerable emotions that arise after heartbreak. "What Do I Do" discusses an ex-boyfriend who accidentally calls her while he is having sex with another woman. She expresses rage, trying to recover from their break-up, but is unable to keep her composure: "Even though you with that bitch now / I get emotional, it's hard to shut it off." "Another Life", the penultimate track of Lana, is a more poignant breakup song. Nostalgic, SZA wonders if she and her former boyfriend could have been happier together in another life.

Furthermore, certain tracks detail SZA's experiences with self-destructive and abusive behavior in romance. The relationships portrayed in those songs are described as having failed due to toxic partners, unrequited love, or bad habits. Occasionally, these unhealthy habits are condoned or enabled. In "Scorsese Baby Daddy" – named after film director Martin Scorsese – SZA yearns for an emotionally unstable man and portrays herself as a drama-loving woman. Her object of affection reflects a character archetype found across Scorsese's filmography: dangerous and violent criminals. The narrator in "Kitchen" returns to a relationship with a toxic ex-boyfriend, with whom she cut ties due to his mistreatment and abuse. Although she sings they have a "real history", she keeps questioning herself whether she should leave him again or continue to stay.

In the songs discussing maturity and self-improvement, SZA acknowledges her desire to take accountability and learn from past mistakes. She reminds herself, in "Crybaby", that she should stop blaming the world for all of her problems. The lyrics of "Joni" and "Love Me 4 Me" indicate that she has developed self-confidence and learned to be resilient with her family's support. "Joni" is a homage to her parents in particular; it also discusses her unwavering effort to achieve perfection amid the difficulties of life. She sings: "I been wiped out like 3 times / Beat dat shit call me nine lives." SZA thanks her mother in "Love Me 4 Me" for her unconditional support and compassion, chastising a former lover for not extending the same grace. Occasionally, she takes an existential approach to reflecting on growth. The lead single "Saturn" is about wishing to leave Earth for a potentially better life on the titular planet, a place where SZA could possibly break free from toxic habits and the pain of heartbreak. She struggles with existential crises and seeks escapism in "Drive", as she reflects on feeling alienated despite her success.

A few tracks on Lana also contain some antagonistic and braggadocious lyrics. Some lines in "Drive" are about SZA taunting adversaries jealous of her success. In one lyric, she boasts that her ex-boyfriends still love her. "My Turn" is about getting rightful revenge towards a former partner for the pain they caused the narrator. SZA sings about "wiping 'em down in front of they nigga" (being significantly better than someone) in "30 for 30", a collaboration with rapper Kendrick Lamar. According to HotNewHipHop, many fans saw the lyric as an allusion to Lamar's feud with fellow rapper Drake, who said in a diss track that SZA has him "wiped down".

== Aesthetic and title ==
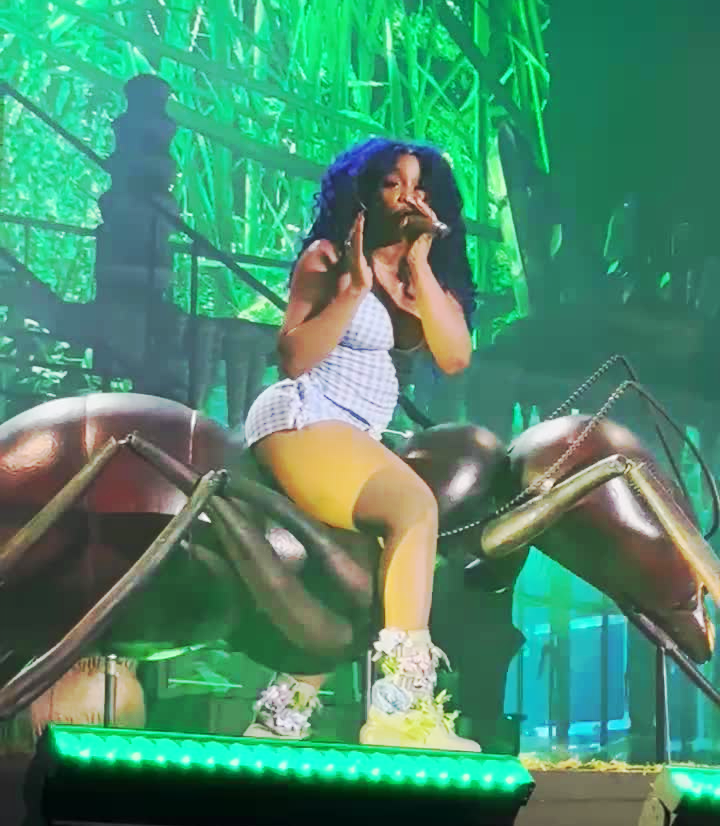
SZA performing atop a large ant prop during Osheaga Festival. The aesthetic for Lana was teased during multiple concerts in 2024.

Lana's aesthetic centers around nature, in particular insects. SZA first teased the reissue's visuals on May 31, 2024, by sharing her full-body cosplay of one via Instagram. At her BST Hyde Park concert held in June, there were several stage props of various insects, such as a statue of a large ant. She showed a video of her in another bug costume as the track "Crybaby" played during the set. The clip was shared again on social media after the show. When SZA appeared on Hot Ones, a YouTube series where guests eat several spicy chicken wings, she wore an insect prosthetic on her face. During her episode, SZA said that her reason for incorporating insects into the album visuals was because "being a person is daunting".

The official cover art for Lana shows SZA as an insect-like creature in streetwear, wearing a yellow camouflage jacket and cargo pants. The background is dominated by tall grass. To achieve her look, SZA wore a prosthetic mask and had black body paint applied all over her body. The cover was revealed on December 18, 2024, and shot by Cassidy Meyers.

Six placeholder covers for Lana were posted on social media back on December 10, 2023, five of which show her among various flora and fauna. One shows her in a yellow camping tent; in another, she wears a headdress and bikini fashioned from leaves. In three others, she is handling farm animals. The cover artworks were styled by frequent collaborator Alejandra Hernandez. SZA is portrayed as a "child of nature"; her outfits are particularly designed to evoke a visceral feeling of free-spiritedness. Amel Mukhatar of British Vogue described the style as Bohemian, specifically referencing the nonconformist African American hipsters of the 1940s.

For Lana's title, SZA used her real name, Solána Imani Rowe. Often called "Lana" during childhood, she got a tattoo of her first name at 13 years old, but she could not afford to tattoo all six letters. She had to pay $10 for each, but having only $40, she used only the last four letters of "Solána" for her tattoo.

== Promotion ==
=== Release ===
Lana was released on December 20, 2024, although it was pushed from midnight EST to 3 pm due to final changes to the album's mixing. The pre-save link was shared two days prior. On December 10, in celebration of SOS's second anniversary, SZA posted a trailer on social media accompanied by a track that samples the Isley Brothers' "Voyage to Atlantis". In the video, she is shown walking in the forest where she urinates beside a stream. The trailer closes with an overlaid text of Lana's title appearing above the words "SOS Deluxe". Previously, Lana and the deluxe edition were supposed to be different from each other.

The official announcement of Lana took place in Brooklyn Navy Yard, during an invite-only surprise party to celebrate the success of SOS. During the event, SZA performed four songs intended for the deluxe edition: "Saturn", "PSA", "Diamond Boy (DTM)", and "BMF" (then "Boy from South Detroit"). She told Variety that the release would be unexpected, and she compared herself to Frank Ocean and André 3000 in that she was free to do whatever she wanted. Elaborating on her decision to release another full album worth of material, she said that it had become more than expected and referred to the creative process as fun and did not spend too much time living in her "own head". In June 2024, Time listed Lana as one of the most anticipated albums of the year.

Earlier that year, SZA teased that the reissue would be released before the year ended, saying so at the British Vogue interview and a Twitch livestream by Kai Cenat. Over a year prior, she suggested that the reissue was set for release by mid–December 2023, which ultimately did not happen. Addressing the delay, Punch explained that the label had to postpone the release date due to the leaking of several outtakes from SOS, including ones intended for the deluxe edition. One of the leaked songs was "Joni". Promotional pictures for Lana were posted on social media without permission as well. The leaks prompted SZA's decision to separate them and other outtakes into a different project, a plan she reversed when the official release date neared.

=== Teaser songs ===
On December 6, SZA shared a picture of a whiteboard of titles of possible tracks from Lana. All songs were obscured, except for "Saturn". Shortly after the British Vogue cover story, she shared a one-minute clip of her on Instagram freestyling.

SZA teased several songs intended for Lana before its release, apart from "Diamond Boy (DTM)" and "BMF". The track used for the reissue's trailer was "Kitchen", which contained the "Voyage to Atlantis" sample. "Crybaby" was shown at two concerts and teased online shortly after the first one ended.

However, "PSA", which was supposed to be on Lana, was scrapped from the final version by Punch. Also excluded was "Joni" and the song "Take You Down", which SZA previously teased on Instagram via a video showing her in a camping tent and with a red bikini.

Hours after the reissue's release, she shared text conversations between the two on social media in which they discussed its exclusion. According to the screenshot, she had asked Punch for permission to release the two outtakes sometime soon. He replied by saying she can "give it to [the fans] for new years or Christmas." Due to the label's holiday break, the tracks were supposed to be released on an updated version of Lana on January 6, 2025. Because SZA's label had yet to clear a sample used for "Joni", the January 6 date was postponed to February 9. The exact time of release was 7 PM Eastern Time, around an hour before SZA's performance with Kendrick Lamar at the Super Bowl LIX halftime show.

=== Singles ===
"Joni" was uploaded on SoundCloud on August 22, 2021, and was leaked sometime during recording sessions for Lana. The song was intended for the reissue as well as SOS, but it was scrapped from both projects by SZA's manager, Punch.

Discussions about the lead single started in 2023, and "Diamond Boy (DTM)" was the first choice. However, its release date, and therefore Lana's, was postponed because promotion for SOS was still ongoing with its final single "Snooze". The actual lead single from Lana, "Saturn", was surprise-released on February 22, 2024, days after SZA performed it during a Mastercard advertisement on the 2024 Grammy Awards. The performance was heavily nature-themed, and it featured a backdrop of tree and flower props.

On January 7, 2025, Top Dawg and RCA released "BMF" as a pop radio single and "30 for 30" as a rhythmic crossover single. Lana's sole promotional single, "Drive", was released hours before the album at midnight EST. A music video for the song premiered at the same time; it stars filmmaker Ben Stiller, whose character drives an SUV on an empty road at night.

== Critical reception ==
Professional ratings
Review scores
Source	Rating
NME	4/5 stars
Pitchfork	8.8/10
Rolling Stone	4/5 stars

Pitchfork's Shaad D'Souza, in a review that awarded the album Best New Music, wrote that, "unlike the rambunctious, mixtape-y genre hopping of its predecessor, Lana is aesthetically coherent, filled with warm analog synths and soul-ballad tempos," and said that throughout the album, "SZA sounds totally sure in her ability to command a stadium-sized audience with music that's ambling and sometimes insular." Rolling Stone's wrote that "Lana is SZA in moody late-night R&B electro-ballad mode, her sonic imagination and emotional ferocity as vivid as ever."

== Accolades ==
List of awards and nominations received by Lana
Year	Award	Category	Result	Ref.
2025	American Music Awards	Favorite R&B Album	Nominated	
2026	NAACP Image Awards	Outstanding Album	Nominated	

== Commercial performance ==
In the United States, Lana's first-week streams and downloads helped return SOS to number 1 on the Billboard 200, earning 178,000 album-equivalent units. Billboard noted that with its album units alone, Lana would have debuted atop the chart if it were released as a separate album, the fifteen new songs having generated 105,000 album-equivalent units. With the reissue, SOS claimed its eleventh non-consecutive week at number 1, twenty-two months after the tenth – the March 4, 2023–dated chart. It therefore broke the record for the longest gap between weeks at number 1 in the history of the chart.

== Track listing ==
Lana track listing
No.	Title	Writer(s)	Producer(s)	Length
1.	"No More Hiding"	Solána Rowe; Serge Andre Georges Bulot; Michael Uzowuru	Uzowuru	2:42
2.	"What Do I Do"	Rowe; Benjamin Levin; Magnus August Høiberg; Carter Lang; Cody Fayne	Benny Blanco; Cashmere Cat; Lang; ThankGod4Cody	2:47
3.	"30 for 30" (with Kendrick Lamar)	Rowe; Lamar; Bobby DeBarge; Greg Williams; Anthony Jermaine White; Uzowuru	J. White Did It; Uzowuru	4:38
4.	"Diamond Boy (DTM)"	Rowe; Tyran Donaldson; Fayne; Lang; Declan Miers; Jared Solomon; Uzowuru	Lang; Declan Miers; Scum; Solomonophonic; ThankGod4Cody; Uzowuru	3:37
5.	"BMF"	Rowe; Omer Fedi; Lang; Blake Slatkin; Antônio Carlos Jobim; Vinicius de Moraes	Fedi; Lang; Slatkin	3:00
6.	"Scorsese Baby Daddy"	Rowe; Tyler Johnson; Uzowuru	Johnson; Uzowuru	2:33
7.	"Love Me 4 Me"	Rowe; Rob Bisel; Lang; Nick Lee	Bisel; Lang; Lee	3:05
8.	"Chill Baby"	Rowe; Cade Blodgett; Calvin Dickinson; Julian Friedl; Miles McCollum; Jeremiah Raisen; Leonhard Sitz	Cade; Dickinson; Iseeyou; Lil Yachty; SadPony	2:20
9.	"My Turn"	Rowe; Bisel; Fayne; Dylan Neustadter	Bisel; Neustadter; ThankGod4Cody	2:57
10.	"Crybaby"	Rowe; Daniel Abraham Jr.; Fayne; Lang; Miers; Uzowuru; Hannah Wardell	Abraham; Hands; Lang; Miers; ThankGod4Cody; Uzowuru	4:01
11.	"Kitchen"	Rowe; Fayne; Rudolph Isley; O'Kelly Isley Jr.; Ronald Isley; Ernie Isley; Marvin Isley; Chris Jasper	ThankGod4Cody	2:52
12.	"Get Behind Me (Interlude)"	Rowe; Johnny May; Uzowuru; Paul Andrew Williams	Uzowuru	1:48
13.	"Drive"	Rowe; Devin Abrams; Fayne; William Lemos; Dallas Tamaira	Abrams; Billy Lemos; ThankGod4Cody; Tamaira	3:05
14.	"Another Life"	Rowe; Bisel; Uzowuru; Dylan Wiggins	Bisel; Uzowuru; Sir Dylan	3:25
15.	"Saturn"	Rowe; Bisel; Cian Ducrot; Lang; Solomon; Scott Zhang	Bisel; Lang; Monsune; Solomonophonic	3:06
Total length:				46:08

2025 edition bonus tracks
No.	Title	Writer(s)	Producer(s)	Length
16.	"Joni" (featuring Don Toliver)	Rowe; Bisel; Caleb Toliver; Steven Paul Smith	Bisel	2:07
17.	"Take You Down"	Rowe; Fayne; Dexter Suhn	Suhn; ThankGod4Cody	2:39
18.	"Open Arms (Just SZA)"	Rowe; Bisel; Douglas Ford; Teo Halm; Uzowuru	Bisel; Halm; Uzowuru	3:35
19.	"PSA"	Rowe; Bisel; Lang; Will Miller	Bisel; Lang; Miller	1:39
Total length:				55:22

Notes

- The bonus tracks on Lana precede the standard tracks of SOS.
- "PSA" was teased on November 9th, 2022 on her YouTube account.

Sample credits

- "No More Hiding" contains a sample of "Euryale" written and performed by Serge Bulot
- "30 for 30" contains a sample of "I Call Your Name" as performed by Switch, written by Bobby DeBarge and Greg Williams.
- "BMF" contains an interpolation of "The Girl from Ipanema" as performed by Stan Getz and João Gilberto, written by Antônio Carlos Jobim and Vinicius de Moraes.
- "Kitchen" contains a sample of "Voyage to Atlantis" as performed by the Isley Brothers, written by Rudolph Isley, O'Kelly Isley Jr., Ronald Isley, Ernie Isley, Marvin Isley and Chris Jasper.
- "Joni" contains a sample of "Angeles", written and recorded by Elliott Smith.

== Charts ==
Chart performance for Lana
Chart (2024–2025)	Peak position
Italian Albums (FIMI)	74
Japanese Dance & Soul Albums (Oricon)	4
Japanese Western Albums (Oricon)	23
Japanese Hot Albums (Billboard Japan)	51
Norwegian Albums (VG-lista)	4
