= Take You Down (SZA song) =

Song by SZA

from the album SOS Deluxe: Lana (extended)
- Written: March 2024
- Released: February 9, 2025
- Recorded: March 2024
- Length: 2:39
- Label: Top Dawg; RCA
- Songwriters: Solána Rowe; Cody Fayne; Dexter Suhn
- Producers: ThankGod4Cody; Dexter Suhn

Lyric video
- "Take You Down" on YouTube

"Take You Down" is a song by American singer-songwriter SZA. It was released on February 9, 2025, as a bonus track from SOS Deluxe: Lana (2024), the reissue of her second studio album SOS (2022). The song was intended to be part of Lana's original release but was scrapped by SZA's manager.

== Background ==
American singer-songwriter SZA released her second studio album, SOS, on December 9, 2022. Immediately afterward, she posted about the release on Instagram while also teasing that it would have a deluxe edition.

In September 2023, SZA officially that the deluxe edition became a "whole 'nother" project, a reissue titled Lana. She once again suggested that its release was on the way through an Instagram video on March 12, 2024. Captioned "never fight over community dick", the teaser shows SZA as she poses in a camping tent, wearing nothing but a red bikini. A day later, she reposted the song on Twitter and revealed she recorded the video in her garage the night after she finished the song, on March 11.

== Release ==
"Take You Down" was intended to appear on Lana, but SZA's manager, Punch, told her to exclude it from the final tracklist. Hours after the reissue's release, she shared text conversations between the two on social media in which they discussed its exclusion. According to the screenshot, SZA had asked Punch for permission to release "Take You Down" alongside "PSA", another Lana outtake, sometime soon. He replied by saying she can "give it to [the fans] for new years or Christmas."

Due to the holiday break, the label postponed the release to January 6, 2025; the release was postponed again, following some issues with a sample clearance. After a few weeks, SZA's official website was updated to reveal a new release date of February 9. The exact time was 7PM Eastern Time, around an hour before her performance with Kendrick Lamar at the 2025 Super Bowl.

== Charts ==
Weekly chart performance for "Take You Down"
Chart (2025)	Peak position
New Zealand Hot Singles (RMNZ)	26
