= BMF (song) =

Single by SZA

from the album SOS Deluxe: Lana
- Released: January 7, 2025
- Genre: Bossa nova; pop
- Length: 3:00
- Label: Top Dawg; RCA
- Songwriters: Solána Rowe; Blake Slatkin; Carter Lang; Omer Fedi; Antônio Carlos Jobim; Vinicius de Moraes
- Producers: Blake Slatkin; Carter Lang; Omer Fedi

SZA singles chronology
"Luther" (2024)	"BMF" and "30 for 30" (2025)	"PT Cruiser" (2025)

Audio
- "BMF" on YouTube

"BMF" is a song by American singer-songwriter SZA from SOS Deluxe: Lana, the 2024 reissue of her second studio album, SOS (2022). It is a pop and bossa nova song that interpolates the 1962 single "The Girl from Ipanema", composed by Brazilian musician Antônio Carlos Jobim. Cheerful and whimsical, the lyrics are about SZA's attraction to a handsome and dark-skinned man. "BMF" is titled after the television series BMF, centered around a crime syndicate that operates in the southern Detroit area. The song also references the fictional South Detroit mentioned in the 1981 Journey song "Don't Stop Believin'".

The song was released to radio stations in the United States on January 7, 2025, as a single from Lana. It debuted at number 55 on the country's Billboard Hot 100, rising on the chart due to its increasing viral popularity on social media. The song later peaked at number 29. Elsewhere, "BMF" was a top-10 single in parts of Southeast Asia, peaking at number 4 in the Philippines, as well as New Zealand. It reached the top 40 in Canada, Australia, San Marino, and the UK. In reviews of Lana, critics focused on the song's upbeat sound and "Girl from Ipanema" interpolation. Two were complimentary; one felt that the interpolation was out of place.

== Background ==
SZA's second studio album, SOS, was released on December 9, 2022. Shortly after its release, she began teasing a deluxe edition on social media. In an August 2023 interview with Variety SZA revealed that the deluxe edition had evolved into an entirely new project titled Lana, comprising post-SOS material as well as previously unreleased outtakes.

Around SOS's release, The Line of Best Fit reported that American rapper and singer Lizzo was to feature on a track from Lana, supposedly titled "Boy from South Detroit". SZA addressed the song in a podcast episode for Rolling Stone, calling it "BMF" alongside the widely publicized title. She told the interviewers that "BMF" was a fan-favorite outtake from SOS, which was scrapped by her manager Punch. According to SZA, he had told her that the song was not "exciting' enough to be on the standard SOS tracklist. The released version of "BMF", which appears on Lana, is a solo track, with Lizzo nowhere in the credits.

== Music and lyrics ==
"BMF" is a pop and bossa nova song. Its composition is upbeat, whimsical, and lighthearted, as are the lyrics. In a review of Lana for Pitchfork, Shaad D'Souza wrote that "BMF" has a "TikTok pop" musical style. The song's overall mood deviates from the more angsty and melancholic emotions that are present in other Lana tracks, as well as SZA's past ones. "BMF" interpolates the melody of "The Girl from Ipanema" (1962), composed by Brazilian musician Antônio Carlos Jobim. In particular, it uses the Stan Getz and Astrud Gilberto rendition, which is interpolated by the song's hook.

In the lyrics, SZA fantasizes about a man she finds attractive, convincing him that she is the right woman for a romance. She compliments the subject of the song by calling him "young and fine and dark and handsome". For the "BMF" hook, not only is the melody interpolated, the lyrics of Getz and Gilberto's cover are as well. SZA sings in the hook: "The boy from South Detroit keep bossin' / And I can't keep my panties from dropping / He's so fly." (Note: The mentioned lines from the "BMF" hook are cited to Variety and Rolling Stone. The interpolated lyrics are: "Tall and tan and young and lovely / The girl from Ipanema goes walking / And when she passes, each one she passes goes 'ah!'") Later, she sings more seductively, inviting her love interest to have sex: "I'm just tryna hear you say my name."

According to Sam Prance of Capital FM, the song gets its title from the television series BMF. The show is based on the drug trafficking syndicate Black Mafia Family, which operates in the southern neighborhoods of Detroit. Prance writes that the "BMF" lyrics are about SZA's attraction to men similar to those portrayed in the show. Meanwhile, the hook in particular references the fictional South Detroit mentioned in the 1981 Journey song "Don't Stop Believin'". Another location SZA mentions in "BMF" is a road in Los Angeles called Slauson Avenue. Rob Sheffield of Rolling Stone writes that it may be a tribute to Nipsey Hussle, a rapper raised in the nearby Crenshaw neighborhood and shot dead at the same road.

== Release ==
After the Variety interview, in September 2023, SZA performed "BMF" alongside two other Lana tracks at a concert in New York. Leaks of the song circulated online, sometime before the reissue's release.

"BMF" is the fifth track of Lana, released on December 20, 2024. In the US, it was released to contemporary hit radio stations on January 7, 2025. The same month, it was released to rhythmic contemporary radio as well. The song received radio airplay in Italy on January 17, 2025.

== Critical reception ==
Critics who reviewed Lana and mentioned "BMF" tended to focus on the composition. In a track-by-track ranking for Billboard, Mackenzie Cummings-Grady wrote positively about the song's upbeat nature. According to him, the pop sound and lighthearted lyrics successfully provided Lana with enough levity to balance the heavier themes of its other tracks. He ranked it as the reissue's 11th-best song. Variety journalist Jem Aswad, who highlighted its "Girl from Ipanema" interpolation, listed "BMF" as one of Lana's standouts. Meanwhile, Pitchfork's D'Souza found the interpolation somewhat out of place, writing that it added "a wrinkle" to the pop composition.

"BMF" placed at number 69 on Billboard's list of the best 2025 songs. Sophie Williams wrote in the song's entry: "SZA animates desire like nobody else, winding it up like a toy and letting it go to show the erratic nature of her feelings. There’s no messing around on 'BMF' [...] It's pure melodic magic."

== Commercial performance ==
"BMF" debuted at number 55 on the US Billboard Hot 100 chart and number 75 on the Philippines Hot 100. Due to its increasing viral popularity on social media, it reached the Philippines' top 10 as soon as the second week. It later peaked at number 4. Other countries where "BMF" reached the top 10 include Malaysia (8), Singapore (9), and New Zealand (10). On the Canadian Hot 100, it was Lana's highest-charting song from Lana (24). Elsewhere, "BMF" was a top-40 song in Australia, San Marino, and the UK. On the Billboard Global 200 chart, it peaked at number 24.

"BMF" appeared on several US radio charts. The single reached the top 10 on both Rhythmic and Pop Airplay; respectively, it peaked at number 9 and number 7. The song also charted on Dance/Mix Show Airplay and Adult Pop Airplay, peaking at numbers 23 and 25 respectively. After being released to radio, "BMF" peaked at number 29 on the Billboard Hot 100.

== Live performances ==
Following the live debut of "BMF" in New York, SZA gave the first performance of the officially released version in 2025. The song was included in the set list of the Grand National Tour, which she co-headlined with rapper Kendrick Lamar. The concert was structured into nine acts, with SZA performing the song during the seventh act.

== Personnel ==
Adapted from Tidal

- Solána Rowe (SZA) – songwriting
- Omer Fedi – production, songwriting
- Carter Lang – production, songwriting
- Blake Slatkin – production, songwriting
- Antônio Carlos Jobim – songwriting ("The Girl from Ipanema" sample)
- Vinicius de Moraes – songwriting ("The Girl from Ipanema" sample)
- Michael Uzowuru – additional production
- Hayden Duncan – assistant engineering
- Conner McFarland – assistant engineering
- Mason Sexton – assistant engineering
- Tommy Turner – assistant engineering
- Jon Castelli – mixing
- Dale Becker – mastering
- Adam Burt – assistant mastering
- Noah McCorkle – assistant mastering

== Charts ==
=== Weekly charts ===
Weekly chart performance for "BMF"
Chart (2024–2025)	Peak position
Australia (ARIA)	16
Australia Hip Hop/R&B (ARIA)	2
Canada Hot 100 (Billboard)	24
Canada CHR/Top 40 (Billboard)	8
Costa Rica Anglo Airplay (Monitor Latino)	4
Czech Republic Airplay (ČNS IFPI)	41
Estonia Airplay (TopHit)	33
Global 200 (Billboard)	24
Ireland (IRMA)	24
Italy Airplay (EarOne)	12
Japan Hot Overseas (Billboard Japan)	19
Latvia Airplay (LaIPA)	11
Lithuania Airplay (TopHit)	83
Malaysia (Billboard)	13
Malaysia International (RIM)	8
New Zealand (Recorded Music NZ)	10
Philippines (Philippines Hot 100)	4
San Marino Airplay (SMRTV Top 50)	11
Singapore (RIAS)	9
Suriname (Nationale Top 40)	16
UK Singles (Official Charts)	21
UK Hip Hop/R&B (Official Charts)	2
US Billboard Hot 100	29
US Adult Pop Airplay (Billboard)	25
US Pop Airplay (Billboard)	6
US Dance Airplay (Billboard)	16
US Rhythmic Airplay (Billboard)	2

=== Monthly charts ===
Monthly chart performance for "BMF"
Chart (2025)	Peak position
Czech Republic (Rádio Top 100)	52
Estonia Airplay (TopHit)	49

=== Year-end charts ===
Year-end chart performance for "BMF"
Chart (2025)	Position
Canada (Canadian Hot 100)	81
Canada CHR/Top 40 (Billboard)	51
Philippines (Philippines Hot 100)	51
US Billboard Hot 100	76
US Pop Airplay (Billboard)	29
US Rhythmic Airplay (Billboard)	13

== Certifications ==
Certifications for "BMF"
Region	Certification	Certified units/sales
Canada (Music Canada)	Platinum	80,000^{‡}
New Zealand (RMNZ)	Platinum	30,000^{‡}
United Kingdom (BPI)	Silver	200,000^{‡}
United States (RIAA)	Platinum	1,000,000^{‡}
^{‡} Sales+streaming figures based on certification alone.

== Release history ==
Release dates and formats for "BMF"
Region	Date	Format(s)	Label(s)	Ref.
United States	January 7, 2025	Contemporary hit radio	Top Dawg; RCA	
Italy	January 17, 2025	Radio airplay	Sony Italy	
United States	January 2025	Rhythmic contemporary radio	Top Dawg; RCA	
