= Open Arms (SZA song) =

2022 song by SZA featuring Travis Scott

Song by SZA featuring Travis Scott

from the album SOS
- Written: 2021–2022
- Released: December 9, 2022
- Recorded: 2021–2022
- Length: 3:59
- Label: Top Dawg; RCA
- Songwriters: Solána Rowe; Jacques Webster; Rob Bisel; Michael Uzowuru; Teo Halm; Douglas Ford
- Producers: Michael Uzowuru; Teo Halm; Rob Bisel

Lyric video
- "Open Arms" on YouTube

"Open Arms" is a song by American singer-songwriter SZA from her second studio album, SOS (2022), featuring American rapper Travis Scott. It is a ballad backed by an acoustic guitar, conceived as part of an effort to explore soundscapes outside of SZA's usual R&B-leaning music. The lyrics are addressed to a former lover, whom the narrator leaves for the sake of her self-esteem despite her persistent feelings of attachment to him. A tribute to SZA's deceased grandmother, Norma Rowe, begins the song, done in the form of a skit; Rowe's vocals featured prominently on SZA's debut album, Ctrl (2017).

Upon release, "Open Arms" charted in the United States, Canada, and Australia, with a number 67 peak on the Billboard Global 200. Critics focused on Scott's appearance on the song—some considered him a fitting addition, welcoming his uncharacteristically gentle tone on the third verse. "Open Arms" marks Scott and SZA's fourth collaboration; its solo version appears on a 2023 download-only edition of SOS, as well as the 2025 extended version of the album's deluxe reissue Lana.

== Background ==
SZA released her debut studio album, Ctrl, in 2017. Primarily an R&B album that deals with themes like heartbreak, it received widespread acclaim for SZA's vocals and the eclectic musical style, as well as the emotional impact and confessional nature of the songwriting. The album brought SZA to mainstream fame, and critics credit it with establishing her status as a major figure in contemporary pop and R&B music and pushing the boundaries of the R&B genre. (Note: Cited to Vulture, The Recording Academy, The Line of Best Fit, NME, The Daily Telegraph, The New Yorker, and Consequence.) Her next studio album was therefore highly anticipated, and she alluded to its completion as early as August 2019 during an interview with DJ Kerwin Frost.

From April to May 2022, SZA told media outlets that she had recently finished the album in Hawaii and said that it was coming soon. For the album, named SOS (2022), she sought to prove her musical versatility and combine her "traditional" R&B sound that had been a staple of her past works with "a little bit of everything", exploring a diverse set of other genres and soundscapes such as stripped-back, acoustic music that makes use of guitars.

During the build-up to the album's release, SZA compiled a list of possible collaborators and reached out to them through private messages. The roster ranged from Billie Eilish, Harry Styles, and Olivia Rodrigo; to Doja Cat, Drake, and Kendrick Lamar. Of the several artists she contacted for the album, only three people sent their verses: Don Toliver, Phoebe Bridgers, and Travis Scott. Toliver and Bridgers appear in the tracks "Used" and "Ghost in the Machine" respectively, while Scott appears in "Low" as a background vocalist and "Open Arms" as a featured artist.

SZA and Scott had collaborated three times beforehand. The two worked on Scott's song "Ok Alright" from Rodeo (2015), SZA's single "Love Galore" from Ctrl (2017), and the song "Power Is Power" from the Game of Thrones soundtrack (2019). Of the two Scott collaborations, "Open Arms" was written first; "Low" was the last song on the album to be written.

== Music and production ==
"Open Arms"
Travis Scott's vocals on "Open Arms" are manipulated using Auto-Tune; he uses his lower register and raps in a gentle manner.

The media had the tendency to categorize SZA as an R&B artist. She refused to be restricted to such a label, and she felt the narrative had developed because she was a Black woman. Countering what she believed was racial bias, she said: "I love making Black music, period. Something that is just full of energy. Black music doesn't have to just be R&B [...] Why can't we just be expansive and not reductive?" The album's acoustic, stripped-back sound manifests in tracks such as "Open Arms".

"Open Arms" is among the album's songs that have an acoustic sound, backed by a finger-picked guitar that puts emphasis on SZA's soft vocal performance. In a departure from his usual sharp, energetic trap sound, Scott performs with a gentle rap cadence; (Note: Cited to NME, Vulture, the Financial Times, and Triple J.) he uses his lower register, with his vocals digitally manipulated using Auto-Tune. Also appearing on the song is SZA's grandmother, Norma Rowe, in the form of a voice recording. Rowe was SZA's grandmother who died from Alzheimer's disease during recording sessions for SOS, which caused her to go through frequent depressive episodes, and like Scott, Rowe's vocals prominently featured in Ctrl. Nylon wrote that she helped provide "Open Arms" a heartwarming tone to contrast much of the album's other tracks which are "roiling at the brim with anger, sadness, insecurity, and loneliness".

Producer Carter Lang cited time pressure as the driving force behind the creation of many songs on SOS. Work on the album began in 2019, but much of "Open Arms" was written and recorded around the tailend of 2021, with 2022 the year they started being at their most productive. The choice to have Scott depart from the more uptempo, trap sound of "Love Galore" was an idea from fellow SOS producer Rob Bisel, who wanted him to do something unexpected for the album: "it just seems like there's no need to repeat the same play from that playbook, like what's something you wouldn't expect from Travis?" Upon hearing the suggestion, SZA sent Scott the beat and received his verse one or two weeks later, during the final stages of the album recording process.

Apart from Halm and Bisel, who is also the song's mixer and engineer, the list of producers includes Michael Uzowuru. The three, SZA, and Scott are credited as songwriters alongside one Douglas Ford. Engineering took place at Ponzu Studios and Westlake Studio A in Los Angeles, and the mixing and mastering were done a day before the album was turned in. Bisel and Scott's mixer, Derek "206derek" Anderson, mixed "Open Arms" at Ponzu, and Dale Becker mastered it at his studio in Pasadena, California.

== Lyrics ==
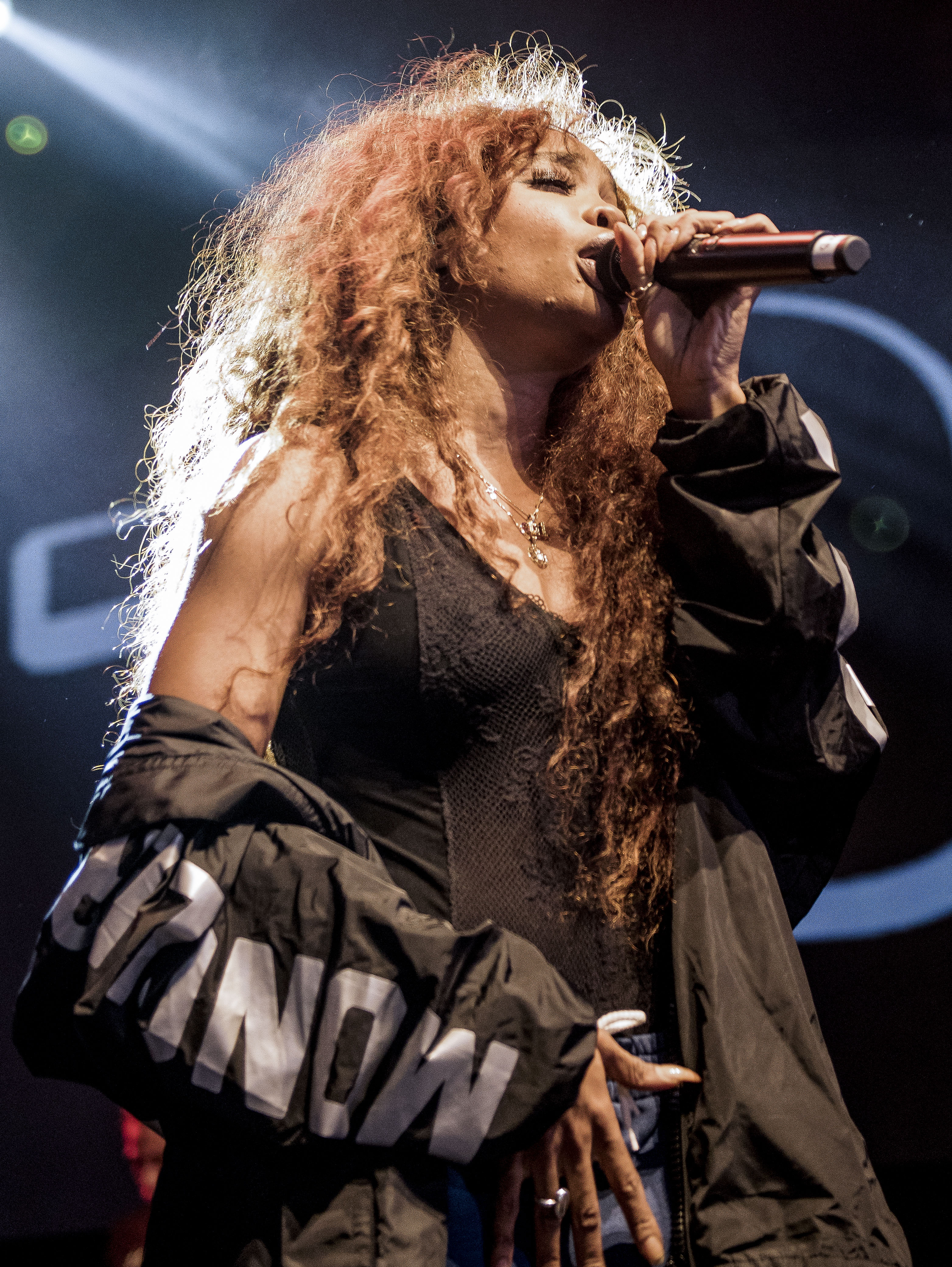
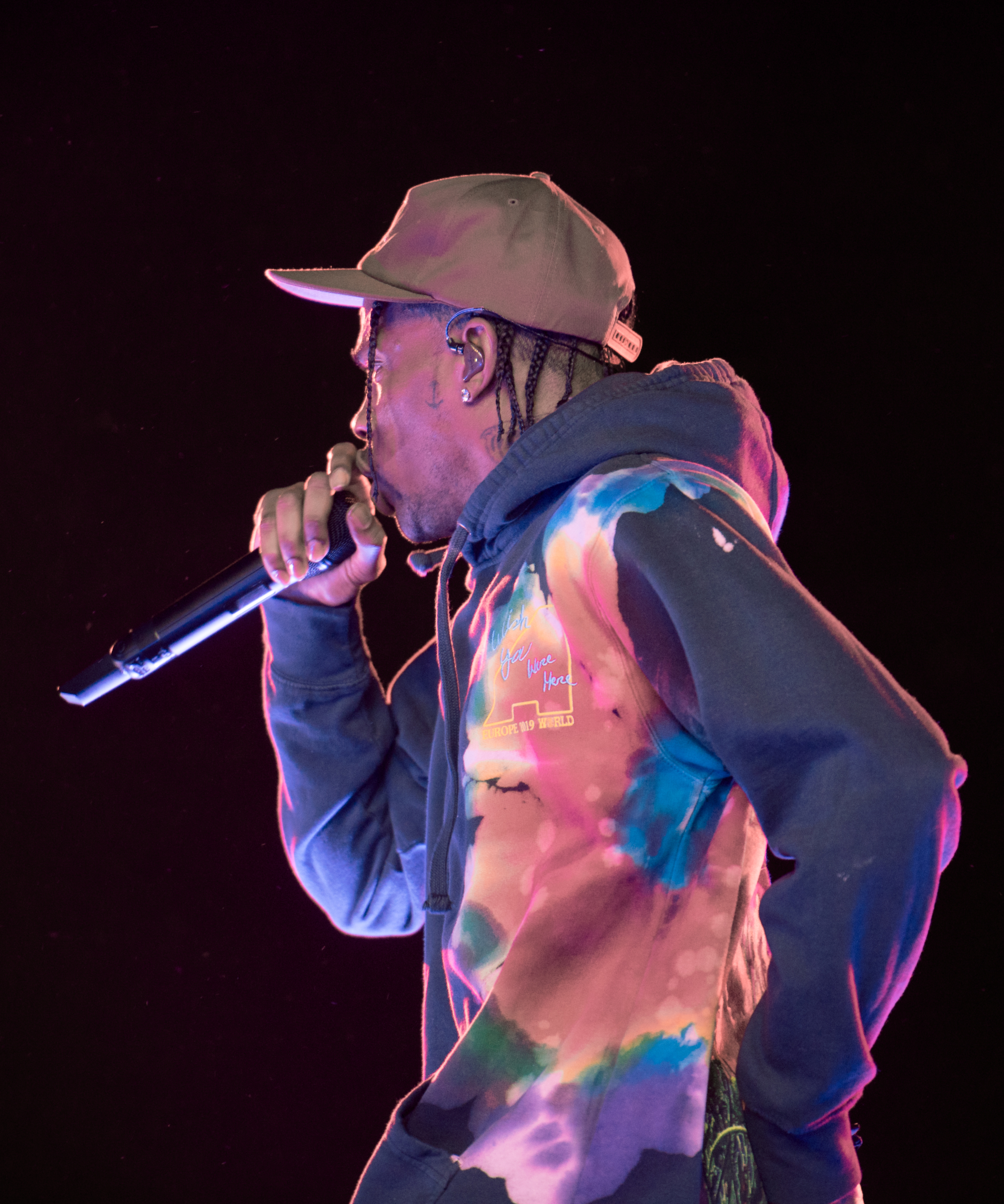
SZA (left) collaborated with Travis Scott (right) for "Open Arms".

Many SOS tracks explore the conflict between SZA's desire for a new life on her own and a longing for a fulfilling romantic connection, to the detriment of her self-image. "Open Arms" is one song that features such a conflict, depicting the narrator's continued attachment to a relationship even though it has become unhealthy for her. In the lyrics, she admits she is willing to still be with her ex-boyfriend no matter how much they are actually incompatible and no matter how much it takes a toll on her mental health, to the point where she sings in one line, "Who needs self-esteem, anyway?" She hopes that staying with her ex-boyfriend will sate her desire of finally being appreciated by someone, admitting: "I hate myself to make you stay / Push me away, I'll be right here." According to music journalist Danyel Smith, the line mirrors SZA's personal life in that it recalls her history with rejection from people with whom she wanted to form close friendships.

Scott appears in the third verse as her romantic foil. He calls her his "ride-or-die" and his "favourite color", reassuring her that he will treat her as best as he can "no matter what comes between" them. A solo version of "Open Arms" replaces Scott with SZA's take on the third verse. In it, her character sings about a time she cried for one whole night, forlorn about her past relationships. Instead of feeling alone, she says, she would rather have sex with her ex-boyfriend again, because she believes he still loves her for who she is. Throughout the original version, the two try to welcome each other back into their life, reluctant to leave the relationship. By the end, however, SZA's character realizes that she must, in the words of XXL, "accept isolation with open arms" so that no person will break her heart again.

== Release ==
During a Billboard cover story published in November 2022, SZA revealed the album title, as well as the release date which was scheduled sometime next month. She posted the album's track list on Twitter on December 5, and SOS was released four days later. "Open Arms" appears as the 20th out of 23 tracks. The song had its live performance debut during the SOS Tour, an international tour in support of the album.

== Commercial performance ==
Upon the album's release, "Open Arms" charted in Canada, the United States, and Australia. The song peaked in those countries at numbers 51, 54, and 81, respectively. It peaked at number 24 on the US Hot R&B/Hip-Hop Songs chart and number 67 on the Billboard Global 200, In 2026, the song was certified triple platinum by the Recording Industry Association of America for selling over 3,000,000 units.

That same year, "Open Arms" began entering more national charts, as it experienced a resurgence in consumption. It entered the New Zealand chart in 2024, peaking at number 29 there. In 2025, it peaked at number 91 in Ireland, 63 in the UK, and 37 in the Philippines.

== Critical reception ==
Much of critical commentary around "Open Arms" focused on Scott's guest feature. Some critics considered him a fitting addition on the song, welcoming his uncharacteristically gentle tone on the third verse and praising him and SZA for expanding into a more gentle, acoustic sound. (Note: Cited to NME, the Financial Times, Triple J, and The Observer.) As Kitty Empire wrote for The Observer, "Versatility largely wins out [on SOS]. Only SZA could find room for Travis Scott on a slow jam ballad". Variety's A. D. Amorosi and the Los Angeles Times's Mikael Wood found the composition of "grand and gorgeous" quality; Amorosi in particular deemed Scott the song's centerpiece. Other praise was directed towards his chemistry with SZA in comparison to "Love Galore" and Rowe's voice as (in tandem with Scott's feature) a "nice nod" to Ctrl. Meanwhile, writing for Time, Andrew Chow and Moises Mendez II thought Scott's contributions were tolerable at best, and Mendez was more impressed with his background vocals for "Low".

== Solo version ==
"Open Arms (Just SZA)"

Song by SZA

from the album Lana (extended)
- Released: February 9, 2025
- Length: 3:35
- Label: Top Dawg; RCA
- Songwriters: Solána Rowe; Rob Bisel; Michael Uzowuru; Teo Halm; Douglas Ford
- Producers: Michael Uzowuru; Teo Halm; Rob Bisel

Lyric video
- "Open Arms (Just SZA)" on YouTube

The solo version of "Open Arms" was released through an extended, digital download−only edition of SOS on January 5, 2023. The edition was available exclusively on Top Dawg Entertainment's website. The release occurred following a close competition for the Billboard 200 number-one spot between SOS and Taylor Swift's Midnights (2022). The extended edition was released to boost SOS's performance on the chart, a strategy Swift also did with her album.

On February 7, 2025, SZA's official website was surreptitiously updated with an announcement. It stated that an extended version of Lana–the reissue album of SOS–would be released two days later, following multiple delays. The solo version's inclusion had been teased on social media last December 2024, via screenshots of SZA's text conversations with her manager Punch. It was officially released to streaming platforms on the scheduled date, under the subtitle "Just SZA", hours before her Super Bowl LIX halftime show performance.

== Credits ==
Adapted from the liner notes of SOS

Recording and management

- Engineered at Ponzu Studios and Westlake Studio A (Los Angeles, California)
- Mixed at Ponzu
- Mastered at Becker Mastering (Pasadena, California)

Personnel

- Solána Rowe (SZA) – lead vocals, background vocals, songwriting
- Jacques Webster (Travis Scott) – lead vocals, songwriting
- Granny (Norma Rowe) – skit
- Rob Bisel – background vocals, songwriting, production, engineering, mixing
- Michael Uzowuru – songwriting, production
- Teo Halm – songwriting, production, guitar, drums, keyboards
- Douglas Ford – songwriting
- Robert N. Johnson – assistant engineering
- Shelby Epstine – assistant engineering
- Derek "206derek" Anderson – vocal engineering and mixing (for Scott's vocals)
- Dale Becker – mastering
- Katie Harvey – assistant mastering
- Noah McCorkle – assistant mastering

== Charts ==
=== Weekly charts ===
2022 weekly chart performance for "Open Arms"
Chart (2022)	Peak position
Australia (ARIA)	81
Canada Hot 100 (Billboard)	51
Global 200 (Billboard)	67
US Billboard Hot 100	54
US Hot R&B/Hip-Hop Songs (Billboard)	24

2024–2025 weekly chart performance for "Open Arms"
Chart (2024–2025)	Peak position
Australia Hip Hop/R&B (ARIA)	24
Ireland (IRMA)	91
New Zealand (Recorded Music NZ)	29
Philippines (Philippines Hot 100)	37
UK Singles (OCC)	63
UK Hip Hop/R&B (OCC)	25

2025 weekly chart performance for "Open Arms (Just SZA)"
Chart (2025)	Peak position
New Zealand Hot Singles (RMNZ)	13
US Bubbling Under Hot 100 (Billboard)	8
US Hot R&B/Hip-Hop Songs (Billboard)	47

=== Year-end charts ===
Year-end chart performance for "Open Arms"
Chart (2023)	Position
US Hot R&B/Hip-Hop Songs (Billboard)	59

== Certifications ==
Certifications for "Open Arms"
Region	Certification	Certified units/sales
Brazil (Pro-Música Brasil)	Gold	20,000^{‡}
Canada (Music Canada)	3× Platinum	240,000^{‡}
Denmark (IFPI Danmark)	Gold	45,000^{‡}
New Zealand (RMNZ)	2× Platinum	60,000^{‡}
Portugal (AFP)	Platinum	10,000^{‡}
United Kingdom (BPI)	Gold	400,000^{‡}
United States (RIAA)	3× Platinum	3,000,000^{‡}
^{‡} Sales+streaming figures based on certification alone.

== Release history ==
Release dates and formats for "Open Arms"
Region	Date	Format	Label	Version	Ref.
Various	December 9, 2022	Digital download; streaming	Top Dawg; RCA	Original	
Various	January 5, 2023	Digital download	Top Dawg; RCA	Solo	
Various	February 9, 2025	Digital download; streaming	Top Dawg; RCA	Solo	
