= Love Galore =

2017 single by SZA featuring Travis Scott

Single by SZA featuring Travis Scott

from the album Ctrl
- Released: April 28, 2017
- Studio: The Lake House (Michigan)
- Genre: Alternative R&B
- Length: 4:35
- Label: Top Dawg; RCA
- Songwriters: Solána Rowe; Jacques Webster II; Cody Fayne; Carter Lang; Tyran Donaldson; Terrence Henderson
- Producers: ThankGod4Cody; Lang; Scum

SZA singles chronology
"Drew Barrymore" (2017)	"Love Galore" (2017)	"What Lovers Do" (2017)

Travis Scott singles chronology
"Go Off" (2017)	"Love Galore" (2017)	"Butterfly Effect" (2017)

Music video
- "Love Galore" on YouTube

"Love Galore" is a song by American singer-songwriter SZA featuring American singer and rapper Travis Scott. It was released through Top Dawg Entertainment and RCA Records as the second single from the former's debut studio album, Ctrl, on April 28, 2017.

The two artists wrote the song alongside Punch and producers ThankGod4Cody, Carter Lang, and Scum. "Love Galore" received widespread acclaim from music critics and a Grammy nomination at the 60th Annual Grammy Awards for Best Rap/Sung Collaboration. An alternate version of the song was included on the deluxe edition of Ctrl, released on the fifth anniversary of the album's release on June 9, 2022, which features an additional verse from SZA that replaces Scott's verse.

== Background ==
The song was recorded in November 2016, during the early stages of developing Ctrl.

While talking about Travis Scott in an interview with Genius, SZA said;

"I’m definitely a huge fan of Travis. I think he merges that super-fine line between melody and syncopation and pocket. And I love his pockets, and I love his note choice. He’s just gnarly. He’s perfect."

The song blends alternative R&B and hip-hop and focuses on themes of love, desire, and the complexities of relationships.

It peaked at number 32 on the Billboard Hot 100 and earning multiple certifications, including nine-times Platinum status by the RIAA.

== Release ==
SZA premiered "Love Galore" during a performance on Jimmy Kimmel Live! in January 2017. The studio version of the song was uploaded on SZA's SoundCloud account on April 27, and the next day "Love Galore" was released for digital download on iTunes as a single. It is the second single from SZA's album, Ctrl, which was released on June 9.

On the five-year anniversary of Ctrl, SZA released in celebration of the milestone the album's deluxe edition. It contains seven bonus tracks, one of which being a version of "Love Galore" without Scott's verse subtitled "Alt version".

To further promote the single following increased airplay on rhythmic and urban radio, SZA performed the song at The Tonight Show with Jimmy Fallon on July 20, 2017. She also performed the song at the 2017 BET Awards and on Saturday Night Live.

Gerrick Kennedy at the Los Angeles Times called the song SZA's "breakout single". Rolling Stone highlighted the song for its "vulnerability beneath the bravado" in their 2023 edition of "The 500 Greatest Albums of All Time".

== Music video ==
The music video for the song, directed by Nabil, premiered on April 27, 2017. It was uploaded to SZA's Vevo channel on April 28, 2017.

In it, SZA & Scott appear to prepare for a bondage session in an upstairs bedroom of a house, with the former tying the latter's hands to the bedposts. SZA gets up to look out the window, seeing an old woman sitting in a car across the street. The woman leaves the car and approaches the house as SZA returns to the bed, where she violently slaps Scott. As he struggles to free himself, she goes downstairs and lets the woman in, exiting afterwards. The woman climbs the stairs and enters the bedroom carrying a pickaxe, which she kills Scott with. Afterwards, she sits in a chair in the corner and laughs. Interspersed are scenes of SZA & Scott singing both together and separately in a gray room full of monarch butterflies.

== Track listing ==
1. “Love Galore” (featuring Travis Scott) - 4:35
2. “Love Galore” (Alt Version) - 4:33

== Credits ==
Adapted from the liner notes of Ctrl

Recording and management

- Recorded at the Lake House (Michigan)
- Travis Scott's vocals recorded at Blake Harden's home studio
- Mastered at Bernie Grundman Mastering (Los Angeles)

Personnel

- Solána Rowe (SZA) – vocals, songwriting
- Jacques Webster (Travis Scott) (Note: Appears courtesy of Epic Records) – vocals, songwriting
- Cody Fayne (ThankGod4Cody) – songwriting, production
- Carter Lang – songwriting, production
- Terrence Henderson – songwriting
- Chris Classick – engineering
- Blake Harden – recording (for Scott)
- Derek "MixedbyAli" Ali – mixing
- Mike Bozzi – mastering

== Charts ==
=== Weekly charts ===
2017 weekly chart performance for "Love Galore"
Chart (2017)	Peak position
Canada Hot 100 (Billboard)	84
US Billboard Hot 100	32
US Adult R&B Songs (Billboard)	1
US Hot R&B/Hip-Hop Songs (Billboard)	12
US R&B/Hip-Hop Airplay (Billboard)	5
US Rhythmic Airplay (Billboard)	3

2022 weekly chart performance for "Love Galore"
Chart (2022)	Peak position
South Africa (RISA)	88

=== Year-end charts ===
Year-end chart performance for "Love Galore"
Chart (2017)	Position
US Billboard Hot 100	80
US Hot R&B/Hip-Hop Songs (Billboard)	39
US Rhythmic (Billboard)	27

== Certifications ==
Certifications for "Love Galore"
Region	Certification	Certified units/sales
Brazil (Pro-Música Brasil)	Platinum	60,000^{‡}
Canada (Music Canada)	4× Platinum	320,000^{‡}
Denmark (IFPI Danmark)	Gold	45,000^{‡}
France (SNEP)	Gold	100,000^{‡}
New Zealand (RMNZ)	5× Platinum	150,000^{‡}
United Kingdom (BPI)	Platinum	600,000^{‡}
United States (RIAA)	9× Platinum	9,000,000^{‡}
^{‡} Sales+streaming figures based on certification alone.

== Release history ==
Release history and formats for "Love Galore"
Region	Date	Format	Version	Label(s)	Ref.
United States	April 28, 2017	Digital download	Original	Top Dawg; RCA	
United States	August 1, 2017	Urban contemporary radio	Original	Top Dawg; RCA	
Various	June 9, 2022	Digital download; streaming	Alt version	Top Dawg; RCA	
