= I Hate U (SZA song) =

2021 single by SZA

Single by SZA

from the album SOS
- Released: December 3, 2021
- Genre: Electro-R&B; yacht rock
- Length: 2:54
- Label: Top Dawg; RCA
- Songwriters: Solána Rowe; Rob Bisel; Carter Lang; Cody Fayne; Dylan Patrice
- Producers: Rob Bisel; Carter Lang; ThankGod4Cody; Sir Dylan

SZA singles chronology
"Kiss Me More" (2021)	"I Hate U" (2021)	"No Love" (2022)

Lyric video
- "I Hate U" on YouTube

"I Hate U" is a song by American singer-songwriter SZA and the second single from her second studio album, SOS (2022). It was released on digital streaming platforms on December 3, 2021, after being uploaded on SoundCloud on August 22. "I Hate U" is an electro-R&B song with a "crunching", light instrumental, a yacht rock keyboard containing a relaxed, "ethereal" chorus, and hip hop-influenced verses. A break-up song, it finds SZA detailing what went wrong in a past relationship, expressing resentment towards an ex-partner but acknowledging that she still misses them.

"I Hate U" entered at number 7 on the United States's Billboard Hot 100, where it became SZA's fifth top-10 entry. It also peaked within the top 40 in Australia, Canada, Ireland, New Zealand, South Africa, and the United Kingdom. The song received certifications from Australia, Canada, New Zealand, the UK, and the US.

== Background ==
In 2017, SZA released her commercially very successful and well-acclaimed debut studio album, Ctrl. Critics throughout the years have credited it as being innovative within the R&B genre, and for establishing her as a major figure in contemporary pop and R&B music. (Note: Cited to The Line of Best Fit, NME, The Daily Telegraph, The New Yorker, and Consequence) SZA spoke in Ctrl variously about romance, desire, and self-esteem, often in a vulnerable tone, as well as the many ways in which emotions like jealousy and intense desire can greatly destroy them.

Facing issues with her label over the delay of her next album's release, SZA posted on Twitter in May 2020 to tell fans she was considering a "music dump". Hosted on SoundCloud, it would consist of several unreleased material she had created from the past six years. Three months later, on August 22, she uploaded three songs on the platform, under the guise of an anonymous SoundCloud account. After revealing the account was hers, she announced that her astrologist encouraged her to release the songs. The three songs were titled "Joni", "I Hate You", and "Nightbird"; on digital streaming platforms, the second is written as "I Hate U".

== Composition and reception ==
"I Hate U" has a lo-fi production. Vulture's Justin Curto labeled "I Hate U" a "groovy breakup song, anchored by SZA's lyrical directness", while Hayden Davies of Pilerats found it a "subtle and seemingly 90s-indebted take on SZA's sound, with a crunching production swaying amongst SZA's vocal". HotNewHipHop's Alexander Cole gave the song a "Very Hottttt" rating, complimenting the "dark production that complements the singer's voice perfectly", and noted, "throughout the track, she sings about a recent breakup and how she wishes things had played out differently". Ciaran Brennan of Hot Press said the song, along with "Joni" and "Nightbird", "showcases SZA's musical diversity", with the singer "switching up between passionate, emotional vocals and relaxed verses". Okayplayer's Robyn Mowat noted how the song "is filled with reflections on love, heartache and her headspace regarding a love gone wrong". NorthJersey.com's Jack McLoone deemed the track signature SZA, despite finding "her vocals on the chorus are more ethereal, while in the verses she skews closer to traditional R&B delivery with some clear hip hop influences. Naledi Ushe of PopSugar called it "a banger for all the heartbroken (past and present) people of the world". Comparing the song to Prince's "Eye Hate U" (1995), Jezebel writers said "a relaxed tempo and veritable yacht rock keyboard underscore lovelorn 'fuck yous' and the overarching idea of hating someone because you love them so much". They noted however, that "despite the song's title, it is not a kiss-off but a call back, praising the "nimble" hook. Billboard's Jason Lipshutz commended the song for showcasing "the vocal power that's made her such a captivating figure in mainstream pop and R&B". Similarly, HipHopDX's David Aaron Blake said, over the "wailing" synth and "lush" instrumental, is SZA's "uncontainable and booming voice". In a 2025 ranking of her discography, The Guardian critic Alexis Petridis rated "I Hate U" as her eighth-best song, with particular praise towards the composition.

== Release ==
Upon the release of "I Hate U” on SoundCloud, the song received a warm response from online fans and went viral on the video-sharing application TikTok. SZA decided to give it an official release, stating: "Honestly, this started out as an exercise. I just wanted somewhere to dump my thoughts without pressure. Y'all made it a thing and I'm not mad LMAO. Ask and you shall receive". After the song reached number 1 on US Apple Music, SZA revealed that "I Hate U" became an official single, posting on social media: "One thing about y'all: y'all gon' make it a single even if it ain't! I love you! Thank you! She also deemed the SoundCloud release an "experiment".

== Commercial performance ==
Following its official release, "I Hate U" debuted at number 1 on the United States's Spotify and Apple Music charts; it broke the record for the most streamed R&B song by a female artist on Apple Music in its first week. The song opened and peaked at number 7 on the Billboard Hot 100; its first-week figures included 26.7 million streams, 4,600 downloads, and 485,000 airplay audiences. The song marked SZA's fifth top-10 entry on the chart and her second to debut in the top 10 after "Kiss Me More", with Doja Cat. On Hot R&B/Hip-Hop Songs, "I Hate U" was her first number 1 song. Meanwhile, on Hot R&B Songs, it became SZA's second chart topper following "The Weekend" in 2018.

In late–March 2022, "I Hate U" reached number 1 on R&B/Hip-Hop Airplay; it marked SZA's first chart topper and the first female artist to top the chart since Megan Thee Stallion with "Savage" in 2020. A few weeks earlier, "I Hate U" became SZA's first solo song and her second overall to top the Rhythmic chart after "Kiss Me More" in 2021. On other Billboard airplay charts, the song peaked at number 33 on Mainstream Top 40 and number 15 on the all-genre Radio Songs. On February 6, 2023, it was certified double platinum by the Recording Industry Association of America (RIAA), and by 2025 it was certified 4× Platinum.

Elsewhere, "I Hate U" debuted and peaked at number 11 on the Billboard Global 200. On national charts, "I Hate U" peaked within the top 40 of New Zealand (8), South Africa (8), Canada (14), Australia (16), Ireland (27), the United Kingdom (38), and further reached Portugal (49) and Lithuania (63). It has received certifications from Australia (platinum), Canada (double platinum), New Zealand (double platinum), and the UK (gold).

== Visualizer ==
A visualizer for "I Hate U" was released on January 7, 2022. The visualizer, directed by Jack Begert, centers around a man (played by actor Lakeith Stanfield) in a heated argument on the phone. After the fiery phone call, he finds himself alone walking along the beach trying to light a cigarette and failing to do so. He then receives a text from SZA that reads "i hate u", prompting him to hurl his phone in the ocean.

== Live performances ==
SZA included "I Hate U" during her headlining set at Glastonbury 2024, held on June 30.

== Accolades ==
List of awards and nominations received by "I Hate U"
Year	Award	Category	Result	Ref.
2022	American Music Awards	Favorite R&B Song	Nominated	
2022	Soul Train Music Awards	The Ashford & Simpson Songwriter's Award	Nominated	
2023	iHeartRadio Music Awards	R&B Song of the Year	Won	
2023	BMI R&B/Hip-Hop Awards	Most Performed Songs of the Year	Won	

== Credits ==
Adapted from the liner notes of SOS

Recording and management

- Engineered at Westlake Studio A (Los Angeles, California)
- Mixed at Ponzu Studios (Los Angeles)
- Mastered at Becker Mastering (Pasadena, California)

Personnel

- Solána Rowe (SZA) – songwriting
- Rob Bisel – songwriting, production, engineering, mixing
- Carter Lang – songwriting, production
- Cody Fayne (ThankGod4Cody) – songwriting, production
- Dylan Patrice – songwriting, production
- Hector Castro – engineering
- Robert N. Johnson – assistant engineering
- Dale Becker – mastering
- Katie Harvey – assistant mastering
- Noah McCorkle – assistant mastering

== Charts ==
=== Weekly charts ===
Weekly chart performance for "I Hate U"
Chart (2021–2022)	Peak position
Australia (ARIA)	16
Canada Hot 100 (Billboard)	14
Global 200 (Billboard)	11
Greece (IFPI)	44
Ireland (IRMA)	27
Lithuania (AGATA)	63
Netherlands (Single Tip)	1
New Zealand (Recorded Music NZ)	8
Portugal (AFP)	49
South Africa (TOSAC)	8
Sweden Heatseeker (Sverigetopplistan)	2
UK Singles (Official Charts)	38
US Billboard Hot 100	7
US Hot R&B/Hip-Hop Songs (Billboard)	1
US Pop Airplay (Billboard)	33
US R&B/Hip-Hop Airplay (Billboard)	1
US Rhythmic Airplay (Billboard)	1

=== Year-end charts ===
2022 year-end chart performance for "I Hate U"
Chart (2022)	Position
Global 200 (Billboard)	169
US Billboard Hot 100	50
US Hot R&B/Hip-Hop Songs (Billboard)	12
US Rhythmic (Billboard)	14

== Certifications ==
Certifications and sales for "I Hate U"
Region	Certification	Certified units/sales
Australia (ARIA)	Platinum	70,000^{‡}
Brazil (Pro-Música Brasil)	Platinum	40,000^{‡}
Canada (Music Canada)	2× Platinum	160,000^{‡}
New Zealand (RMNZ)	2× Platinum	60,000^{‡}
United Kingdom (BPI)	Gold	400,000^{‡}
United States (RIAA)	4× Platinum	4,000,000^{‡}
^{‡} Sales+streaming figures based on certification alone.

== Release history ==
Region	Date	Format	Label	Ref.
Various	December 3, 2021	Digital download; streaming	Top Dawg; RCA	
United States	January 11, 2022	Urban contemporary radio	RCA	
United States	March 15, 2022	Urban adult contemporary radio	RCA	
