= ThankGod4Cody =

American Producer, songwriter, and artist

- Also known as: Cody of Nazareth
- Born: Cody Jordan Fayne; Memphis, Tennessee, U.S.
- Genres: R&B; hip-hop
- Label: ThankGod Records / BMI

Cody Jordan Fayn, known professionally as ThankGod4Cody, is an American producer, songwriter, and musician, most known for his production work on SZA's acclaimed albums Ctrl and SOS, as well as his 2019 debut album Cody of Nazareth.

== Life and career ==
=== Early life and career beginnings ===
Born in Memphis in the 1990s, Fayne had a Southern, Christian upbringing, and was not allowed to listen to much secular music. It was not until his older sister began secretly burning CDs that he would listen to his first album: Kanye West's 2004 album The College Dropout. After a period of study at Middle Tennessee State University, Fayne moved first to Atlanta and then Los Angeles to enter the music industry at the behest of friend and Top Dawg Entertainment producer Tyran "Scum" Donaldson, hoping to work with fellow Tennessean Isaiah Rashad who Fayne knew through mutual friends. He worked at The Home Depot in the meantime to make ends meet, descending into a brief period of depression when his efforts to produce or write on various iterations of Rashad's future album The Sun's Tirade proved unfruitful. Fayne continued to refine his productions, encountering Rashad's TDE labelmate Solana "SZA" Rowe at an impromptu LA studio meeting. Rowe overheard Fayne's production from an adjacent room and immediately knew she wanted the track for herself, which evolved into her 2014 single "Sobriety". She subsequently asked Fayne to attend her 2016 writing camp held at producer Carter Lang's Michigan lake house, where he crafted notable Ctrl records "Love Galore" (with Lang) and "Broken Clocks", among other contributions.

=== 2018-2023: Protest arrest, Ctrl Deluxe and SOS ===
Post-Ctrl, Fayne did not accept any production or songwriting session requests from other artists, and instead began to work on his own music, releasing debut album Cody Of Nazareth in 2019. In 2020, Fayne was arrested in the midst of the George Floyd protests in Los Angeles County, California, which inspired him to release single "Light My Way", asking a "higher power to light [his] way out [of this dark world]". In 2022, "2AM", a record that Fayne worked on for the original "Ctrl" sessions in Michigan (interpolating "Come and See Me" by PartyNextDoor and Drake), as well as co-written outtakes "Percolator", "Tread Carefully", and an alternate version of "Love Galore", appeared alongside several other tracks on a deluxe version of Ctrl released for its fifth anniversary. Fayne also contributed to 7 songs on SZA's sophomore album SOS, including Billboard top-ten single "I Hate U"and "Conceited". He next co-produced "Pray It Away" from Chloe Bailey's 2023 debut solo album In Pieces.

== Discography ==
Studio projects

- Cody of Nazareth (2019)

== Production and songwriting credits ==
Credits are courtesy of Discogs, Tidal, Apple Music, and AllMusic.

Title	Year	Artist	Album
"Sobriety"	2014	SZA	Non-album single
"Easy Bake" (featuring Kendrick Lamar & SZA)	2015	Jay Rock	90059
"Frendz"	2016	20NVR	Non-album single
"Looking For God"	2016	Loose Voltage	Voltage 2: Voice of Love Truth and Good Energy
"My Gun"	2016	Loose Voltage	Voltage 2: Voice of Love Truth and Good Energy
"Praying" (featuring Willie Hyn)	2016	Loose Voltage	Voltage 2: Voice of Love Truth and Good Energy
"Love Galore" (featuring Travis Scott)	2017	SZA	Ctrl
"The Weekend"	2017	SZA	Ctrl
"Broken Clocks"	2017	SZA	Ctrl
"Wavy (Interlude)" (featuring James Fauntleroy)	2017	SZA	Ctrl
"Looking For Love"	2017	Cyhi the Prynce	No Dope on Sundays
"Sleep Walking Challenge" (featuring Tha Landlord)	2017	Starlito	Insomnia Addict 2
"Cuffing Season"	2017	DC the Don	Non-album single
"Closer"	2019	Free P	2Live4U
"I Hate U"	2021	SZA	SOS
"Love Galore (ALT Version)"	2022	SZA	Ctrl (deluxe)
"2AM"	2022	SZA	Ctrl (deluxe)
"Percolator"	2022	SZA	Ctrl (deluxe)
"Tread Carefully"	2022	SZA	Ctrl (deluxe)
"Seek & Destroy"	2022	SZA	SOS
"Love Language"	2022	SZA	SOS
"Notice Me"	2022	SZA	SOS
"Gone Girl"	2022	SZA	SOS
"Conceited"	2022	SZA	SOS
"Too Late"	2022	SZA	SOS
"Pray It Away"	2023	Chlöe	In Pieces
"What Do I Do"	2024	SZA	Lana
"My Turn"	2024	SZA	Lana
"Crybaby"	2024	SZA	Lana
"Kitchen"	2024	SZA	Lana
"Drive"	2024	SZA	Lana
"Take You Down"	2024	SZA	Lana

== Guest appearances ==
List of guest appearances, with other performing artists, showing year released and album name
Title	Year	Other performer(s)	Album
"Wolf River"	2017	Don Lifted	Non-album single

== Awards and nominations ==
Year	Work	Award	Result	Ref
2018	BMI 35 Most Performed R&B/Hip-Hop Songs	"Love Galore"	Won	
2018	Soul Train Music Award for The Ashford & Simpson Songwriter's Award	"Broken Clocks"	Nominated	
2023	BMI Most-Performed R&B/Hip-Hop Songs	"I Hate U"	Won	
2024	Grammy Award for Album of the Year	SOS	Nominated	
