= Braggadocio (rap) =

Self-aggrandizing lyrical content

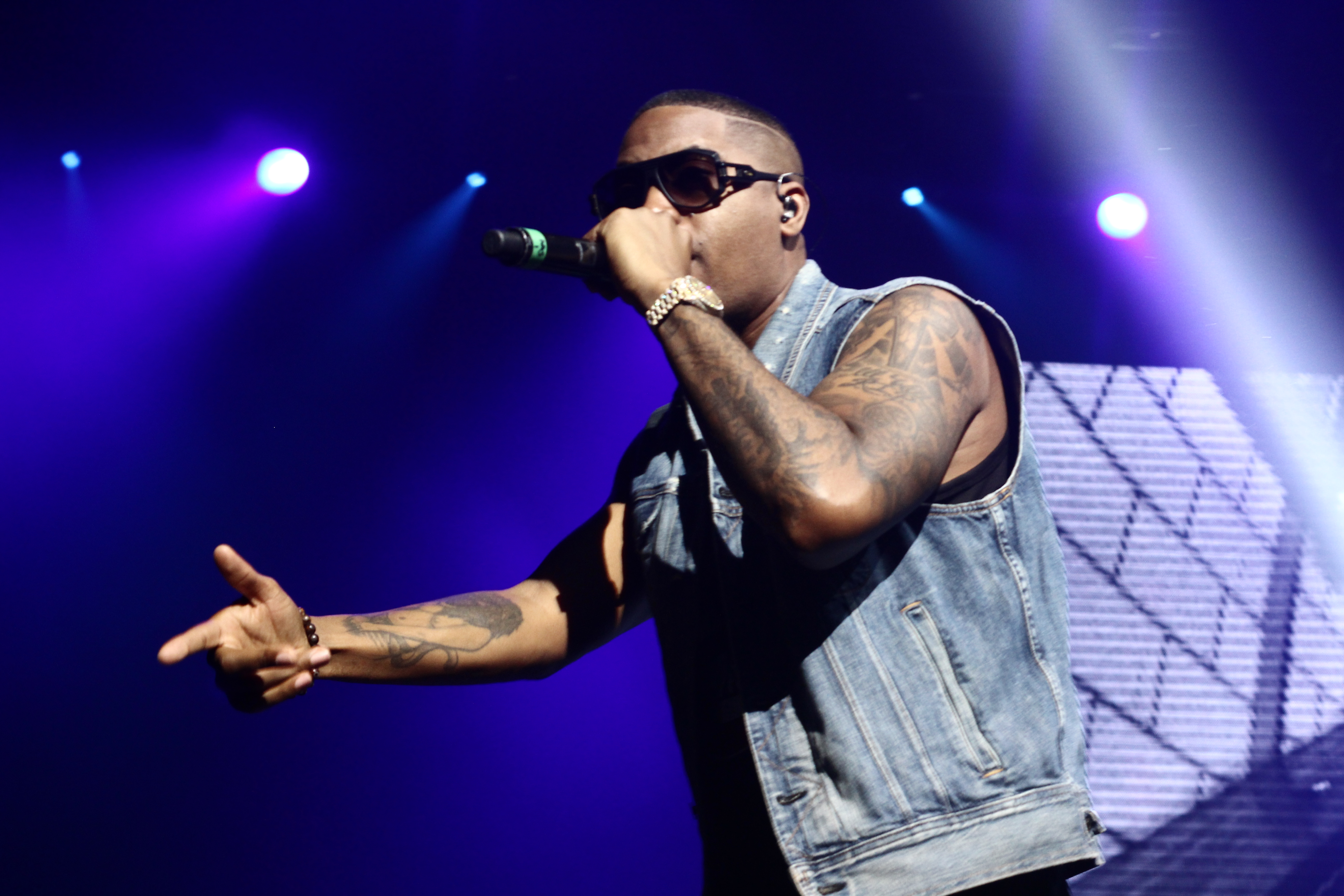
"I'm taking rappers to a new plateau, through rap slow. My rhymin' is a vitamin held without a capsule." — Nas, "N.Y. State of Mind"

Braggadocio is a technique used in rapping where MCs boast in speaking about themselves with great pride. Braggadocio may include subjects such as physicality, fighting ability, financial riches, sexual prowess, or "coolness". Often heavily used in battle rap, braggadocio lyrics can range from just saying, "I'm the best MC ever," to using elaborate phraseology and wit.

== Early years ==
Competition from the old-school hip hop ethic partially explains why braggadocio is used in rap—"my shit is better than yours and that's the bottom line," said MC Esoteric. Gangsta rap helped develop the idea of a "larger-than-life" persona, sometimes to a comedic extreme; however, reading braggadocio literally and seeing it as integral to rap may suppress vulnerability, i.e. an artist's ability to connect emotionally. Murs said, "when you get the microphone, you want to pump yourself up."

== Common subjects of braggadocio ==
=== Wealth ===
According to Pitchfork, "the accumulation of wealth and aspirational living are central themes in rap because, of course, it's the music of America's marginalized communities". It cites examples including Wu-Tang Clan's "C.R.E.A.M." and Eric B. & Rakim's "Paid in Full".

=== Status symbols ===
Material goods as status symbols are a common topic for rap braggadocio. Frequently cited items include high-end cars, designer fashion, jewellery (sometimes called bling), and alcoholic drinks like Cristal champagne and Hennessy. In 50 Cent's "P.I.M.P.", he brags about his material status symbols, such as his luxury car, the high-end wheels on said car, and his jewelry:

I told you fools before, I stay with the tools
I keep a Benz, some rims, and some jewels
I holler at a ho 'til I got a bitch confused
She got on Payless, me? I got on gator shoes

— 50 Cent, "P.I.M.P", Get Rich or Die Tryin' (2003)

=== Self-aggrandizement ===
However, other rappers have criticized this materialistic form of braggadocio. MF Doom, for instance, was prolific in his rejection of gangsta rap's perceived materialism in his braggadocio. He bragged precisely because he did not need status symbols to boast. In the song "Figaro" on his magnum opus Madvillainy, he begins his rap with the affirmation of transcendence of materialism:

The rest is empty with no brain, but the clever nerd
The best MC with no chain ya ever heard
Take it from the TEC-9 holder
They've bit but don't know their neck shine from Shinola

— MF Doom, "Figaro", Madvillainy (2004)

Rap's braggadocio need not be focused on material wealth. It can be self-referential and focus the rapper's artistic or poetic ability. Paul Edwards's book How to Rap cited a short but complex example of braggadocio by Eric B. and Rakim:

I'm the Alpha, with no Omega
Beginning without the end, so play the ...

— Eric B. & Rakim, "No Omega", Let the Rhythm Hit 'Em (1990)

Calling himself Alpha, the first letter of the Greek alphabet, then saying "no Omega" (the last letter), Rakim is suggesting that his flow could last forever—that he starts without ever stopping.

== Etymology ==
The term did not originate as a rap term; its origins are much older. The term originated in the late 16th century and denotes a boaster. It is from Braggadocchio, the name of a braggart in Spenser's The Faerie Queene. It is a composite of the word brag or braggart, and the Italian suffix -occio, denoting something large of its kind.

== See also ==
- Bling-bling
