= List of awards and nominations received by SZA =

SZA awards and nominations
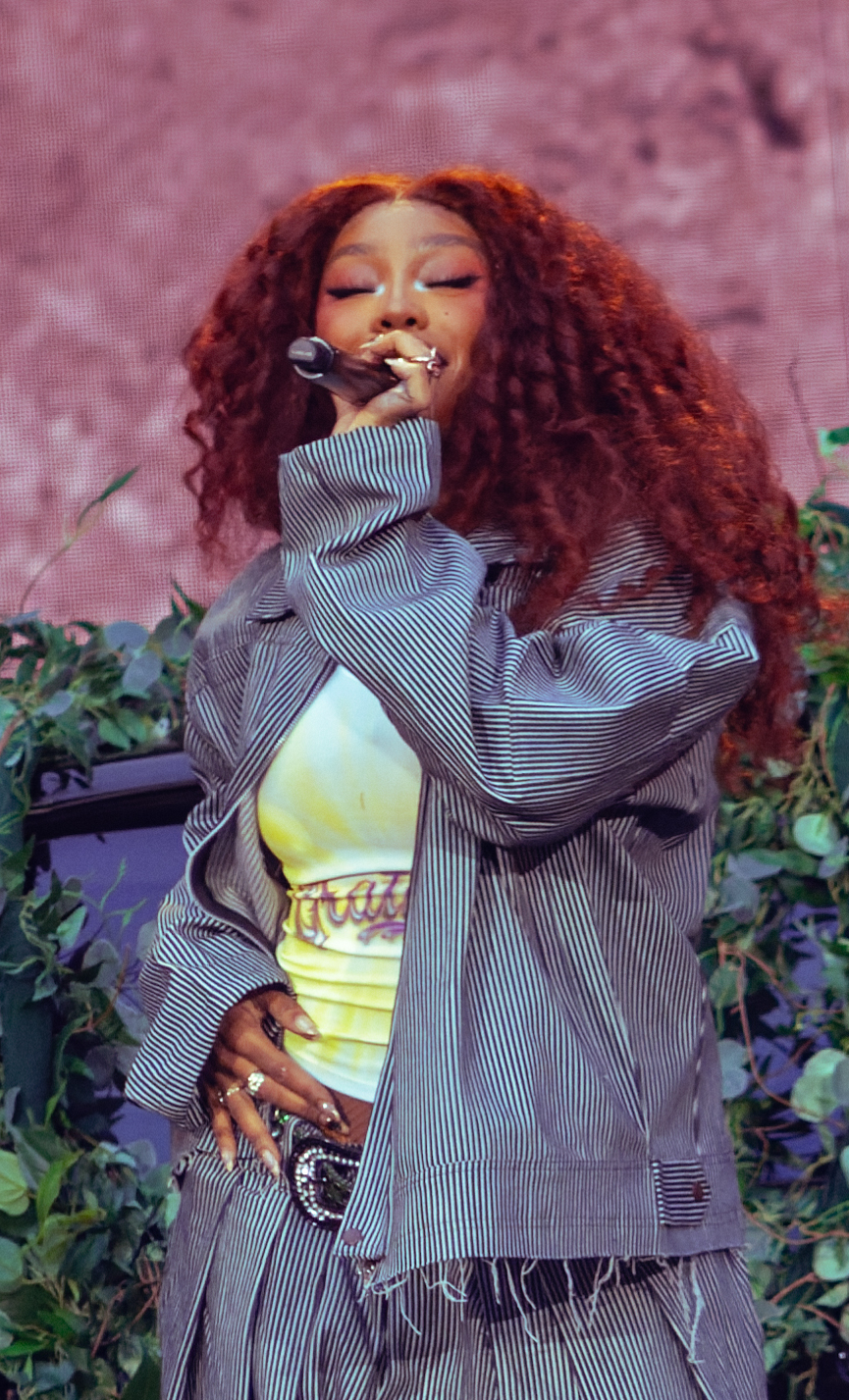
- SZA in 2025
Awards and nominations
Award	Wins	Nominations
Academy Awards	0	1
American Music Awards	4	13
BET Awards	9	25
Billboard Music Awards	8	31
BMI Pop Awards	4	4
BMI R&B/Hip-Hop Awards	11	11
Brit Awards	1	3
Critics' Choice Awards	0	1
Golden Globe Awards	0	1
Grammy Awards	7	31
Guild of Music Supervisors Awards	1	2
Hollywood Music in Media Awards	1	1
iHeartRadio Music Awards	8	28
MTV Europe Music Awards	1	11
MTV Video Music Awards	4	25
NAACP Image Awards	4	15
People's Choice Awards	0	3
Satellite Awards	0	1
Songwriters Hall of Fame	1	1
Soul Train Music Awards	6	22

Totals (Note: Certain award groups do not simply award one winner. They acknowledge several different recipients, have runners-up, and have third place. Since this is a specific recognition and is different from losing an award, runner-up mentions are considered wins in this award tally. For simplification and to avoid errors, each award in this list has been presumed to have had a prior nomination.)
- Wins: 84
- Nominations: 265

American singer-songwriter SZA has won 83 awards, including seven Grammy Awards, four MTV Video Music Awards, eight Billboard Music Awards, eight BET Awards, four American Music Awards, six Soul Train Music Awards, and one Brit Award. After beginning her career with two SoundCloud-exclusive EPs, SZA signed to the label Top Dawg Entertainment in 2013, under which she released her third EP and her debut studio album, Ctrl (2017). Due to her work on the album, she earned her first five Grammy nominations and landed herself many Best New Artist nods, winning the ones for the Soul Train Music Awards in 2017 and for the BET Awards in 2018. Highly acclaimed by critics, Ctrl has appeared in several lists of the best 2010s albums as well as the best debut albums of all time.

Before she released her second studio album, SOS (2022), SZA appeared in collaborations with several artists, including Kendrick Lamar with "All the Stars" in 2018. Their song, recorded for the soundtrack of the film Black Panther, introduced SZA to several film award nominations, such as an Academy Award for Best Original Song, a Critics' Choice Award for Best Song, and a Golden Globe Award for Best Original Song. "All the Stars", and the soundtrack, placed on several lists of the best music made for films by publications like Little White Lies. Another of SZA's collaborations, "Kiss Me More" with Doja Cat (2021), earned SZA her first Grammy (Best Pop Duo/Group Performance).

In 2023, SOS received Album of the Year at the Soul Train Music Awards and the BET Awards, and it was placed alongside Ctrl at Rolling Stone's list of the 500 greatest albums of all time. At the 2024 Grammy Awards, SZA was the musician with the most nominations, specifically nine. Increasing her Grammy wins to four, she won Best Progressive R&B Album for SOS alongside two other awards for two of its tracks. Rolling Stone ranked the album's fifth single "Kill Bill" as one of the 500 greatest songs of all time in 2024.

== Awards and nominations ==
List of award nominations, with the year of ceremony, nominee or work, category, and result
Award	Year	Nominee/Work	Category	Result	Ref.
Academy Awards	2019	"All the Stars" (with Kendrick Lamar)	Best Original Song	Nominated	
African-American Film Critics Association Awards	2019	"All the Stars" (with Kendrick Lamar)	Best Song	Won	
American Music Awards	2018	Ctrl	Favorite R&B Album	Nominated	
American Music Awards	2018	SZA	Favorite Female R&B Artist	Nominated	
American Music Awards	2021	SZA	Favorite Female R&B Artist	Nominated	
American Music Awards	2021	"Kiss Me More" (Doja Cat featuring SZA)	Collaboration of the Year	Won	
American Music Awards	2021	"Kiss Me More" (Doja Cat featuring SZA)	Favorite Pop Song	Nominated	
American Music Awards	2022	"I Hate U"	Favorite R&B Song	Nominated	
American Music Awards	2022	SZA	Favorite Female R&B Artist	Nominated	
American Music Awards	2025	SZA	Favorite Female R&B Artist	Won	
American Music Awards	2025	SZA	Artist of the Year	Nominated	
American Music Awards	2025	SOS Deluxe: Lana	Favorite R&B Album	Nominated	
American Music Awards	2025	"Saturn"	Favorite R&B Song	Won	
American Music Awards	2025	"Luther" (with Kendrick Lamar)	Collaboration of the Year	Nominated	
American Music Awards	2025	"Luther" (with Kendrick Lamar)	Favorite Hip-Hop Song	Nominated	
American Music Awards	2026	SZA	Best Female R&B Artist	Won	
American Music Awards	2026	Grand National Tour (with Kendrick Lamar)	Tour of the Year	Nominated	
ARIA Music Awards	2023	SOS	Best International Artist	Nominated	
ASCAP Pop Music Awards	2025	"Saturn"	Winning Songs	Won	
ASCAP Rhythm & Soul Music Awards	2024	"Snooze"	R&B/Hip-Hop and Rap Song of the Year	Won	
BET Awards	2018	Ctrl	Album of the Year	Nominated	
BET Awards	2018	"Love Galore" (featuring Travis Scott)	Coca-Cola Viewers' Choice Award	Nominated	
BET Awards	2018	SZA	Best New Artist	Won	
BET Awards	2018	SZA	Best Female R&B/Pop Artist	Nominated	
BET Awards	2019	SZA	Best Female R&B/Pop Artist	Nominated	
BET Awards	2021	SZA	Best Female R&B/Pop Artist	Nominated	
BET Awards	2021	"Good Days"	BET Her Award	Won	
BET Awards	2022	"Kiss Me More" (Doja Cat featuring SZA)	Video of the Year	Nominated	
BET Awards	2022	"Kiss Me More" (Doja Cat featuring SZA)	Best Collaboration	Nominated	
BET Awards	2023	SOS	Album of the Year	Won	
BET Awards	2023	"Kill Bill"	Coca-Cola Viewers' Choice Award	Nominated	
BET Awards	2023	"Kill Bill"	Video of the Year	Won	
BET Awards	2023	SZA	Best Female R&B/Pop Artist	Won	
BET Awards	2024	SZA	Best Female R&B/Pop Artist	Won	
BET Awards	2024	"Saturn"	BET Her Award	Nominated	
BET Awards	2024	"Rich Baby Daddy" (Drake featuring Sexyy Red and SZA)	Best Collaboration	Nominated	
BET Awards	2024	"Rich Baby Daddy" (Drake featuring Sexyy Red and SZA)	Viewer's Choice Award	Nominated	
BET Awards	2024	"Rich Baby Daddy" (Drake featuring Sexyy Red and SZA)	Video of the Year	Nominated	
BET Awards	2025	SZA	Best Female R&B/Pop Artist	Won	
BET Awards	2025	"Luther" (with Kendrick Lamar)	Viewer's Choice Award	Nominated	
BET Awards	2025	"Luther" (with Kendrick Lamar)	Best Collaboration	Won	
BET Awards	2025	"30 for 30" (with Kendrick Lamar)	Best Collaboration	Nominated	
BET Awards	2026	SZA	Best Female R&B/Pop Artist	Nominated	
BET Awards	2026	"Luther" (with Kendrick Lamar)	Video of the Year	Nominated	
BET Awards	2026	"Girl, Get Up" (Doechii featuring SZA)	BET Her Award	Won	
Billboard Music Awards	2018	Ctrl	Top R&B Album	Nominated	
Billboard Music Awards	2018	SZA	Top R&B Artist	Nominated	
Billboard Music Awards	2018	SZA	Top R&B Female Artist	Won	
Billboard Music Awards	2021	SZA	Top R&B Female Artist	Nominated	
Billboard Music Awards	2022	SZA	Top R&B Female Artist	Nominated	
Billboard Music Awards	2022	"Kiss Me More" (Doja Cat featuring SZA)	Top Hot 100 Song	Nominated	
Billboard Music Awards	2022	"Kiss Me More" (Doja Cat featuring SZA)	Top Collaboration	Nominated	
Billboard Music Awards	2022	"Kiss Me More" (Doja Cat featuring SZA)	Top Viral Song	Won	
Billboard Music Awards	2023	SZA	Top Artist	Nominated	
Billboard Music Awards	2023	SZA	Top Female Artist	Nominated	
Billboard Music Awards	2023	SZA	Top Billboard 200 Artist	Nominated	
Billboard Music Awards	2023	SZA	Top Hot 100 Artist	Nominated	
Billboard Music Awards	2023	SZA	Top Hot 100 Songwriter	Nominated	
Billboard Music Awards	2023	SZA	Top Streaming Songs Artist	Nominated	
Billboard Music Awards	2023	SZA	Top Radio Songs Artist	Nominated	
Billboard Music Awards	2023	SZA	Top Billboard Global 200 Artist	Nominated	
Billboard Music Awards	2023	SZA	Top R&B Artist	Won	
Billboard Music Awards	2023	SZA	Top R&B Female Artist	Won	
Billboard Music Awards	2023	SOS	Top Billboard 200 Album	Nominated	
Billboard Music Awards	2023	SOS	Top R&B Album	Won	
Billboard Music Awards	2023	"Kill Bill"	Top Hot 100 Song	Nominated	
Billboard Music Awards	2023	"Kill Bill"	Top Streaming Song	Nominated	
Billboard Music Awards	2023	"Kill Bill"	Top Billboard Global 200 Song	Nominated	
Billboard Music Awards	2023	"Kill Bill"	Top R&B Song	Won	
Billboard Music Awards	2023	"Snooze"	Top R&B Song	Nominated	
Billboard Music Awards	2024	SZA	Top Female Artist	Nominated	
Billboard Music Awards	2024	SZA	Top Billboard 200 Artist	Nominated	
Billboard Music Awards	2024	SZA	Top Radio Songs Artist	Nominated	
Billboard Music Awards	2024	SZA	Top R&B Artist	Won	
Billboard Music Awards	2024	SZA	Top R&B Female Artist	Won	
Billboard Music Awards	2024	"Saturn"	Top R&B Song	Nominated	
Billboard Women in Music	2018	SZA	Rulebreaker Award	Won	
Billboard Women in Music	2023	SZA	Woman of the Year	Won	
Black Reel Awards	2026	SZA	Outstanding Breakthrough Performance	Nominated	
BMI London Awards	2018	"What Lovers Do" (Maroon 5 featuring SZA)	London Pop Award Songs	Won	
BMI Pop Awards	2019	"What Lovers Do" (Maroon 5 featuring SZA)	Award Winning Songs	Won	
BMI Pop Awards	2022	"Kiss Me More" (Doja Cat featuring SZA)	Most Performed Songs of the Year	Won	
BMI Pop Awards	2024	"Kill Bill"	Most Performed Songs of the Year	Won	
BMI Pop Awards	2024	"Snooze"	Most Performed Songs of the Year	Won	
BMI R&B/Hip-Hop Awards	2018	"Love Galore" (featuring Travis Scott)	Most Performed Songs of the Year	Won	
BMI R&B/Hip-Hop Awards	2019	"All the Stars" (with Kendrick Lamar)	Most Performed Songs of the Year	Won	
BMI R&B/Hip-Hop Awards	2022	"Good Days"	Most Performed Songs of the Year	Won	
BMI R&B/Hip-Hop Awards	2023	"I Hate U"	Most Performed Songs of the Year	Won	
BMI R&B/Hip-Hop Awards	2024	"Shirt"	Most Performed Songs of the Year	Won	
BMI R&B/Hip-Hop Awards	2024	"Nobody Gets Me"	Most Performed Songs of the Year	Won	
BMI R&B/Hip-Hop Awards	2024	"Snooze"	Most Performed Songs of the Year	Won	
BMI R&B/Hip-Hop Awards	2024	"Kill Bill"	Most Performed Songs of the Year	Won	
BMI R&B/Hip-Hop Awards	2024	"Kill Bill"	Song of the Year	Won	
BMI R&B/Hip-Hop Awards	2024	SZA	BMI Champion Award	Won	
BMI R&B/Hip-Hop Awards	2024	SZA	R&B/Hip-Hop Songwriter of the Year	Won	
Brit Awards	2022	"Kiss Me More" (Doja Cat featuring SZA)	International Song	Nominated	
Brit Awards	2024	"Kill Bill"	International Song	Nominated	
Brit Awards	2024	SZA	International Artist	Won	
Critics' Choice Awards	2019	"All the Stars" (with Kendrick Lamar)	Best Song	Nominated	
Ebony Power 100	2024	SZA	Music Innovators	Won	
Film Independent Spirit Awards	2026	SZA	Best Breakthrough Performance	Nominated	
Give Her FlowHERS Awards	2023	SZA	Big Femme Energy	Won	
Global Awards	2024	SZA	Best Hip Hop or R&B	Nominated	
Golden Globe Awards	2019	"All the Stars" (with Kendrick Lamar)	Best Original Song	Nominated	
Grammy Awards	2018	SZA	Best New Artist	Nominated	
Grammy Awards	2018	Ctrl	Best Urban Contemporary Album	Nominated	
Grammy Awards	2018	"The Weekend"	Best R&B Performance	Nominated	
Grammy Awards	2018	"Supermodel"	Best R&B Song	Nominated	
Grammy Awards	2018	"Love Galore" (featuring Travis Scott)	Best Rap/Sung Performance	Nominated	
Grammy Awards	2019	"All the Stars" (with Kendrick Lamar)	Record of the Year	Nominated	
Grammy Awards	2019	"All the Stars" (with Kendrick Lamar)	Song of the Year	Nominated	
Grammy Awards	2019	"All the Stars" (with Kendrick Lamar)	Best Rap/Sung Performance	Nominated	
Grammy Awards	2019	"All the Stars" (with Kendrick Lamar)	Best Song Written for Visual Media	Nominated	
Grammy Awards	2022	"Kiss Me More" (Doja Cat featuring SZA)	Record of the Year	Nominated	
Grammy Awards	2022	"Kiss Me More" (Doja Cat featuring SZA)	Song of the Year	Nominated	
Grammy Awards	2022	"Kiss Me More" (Doja Cat featuring SZA)	Best Pop Duo/Group Performance	Won	
Grammy Awards	2022	Planet Her (deluxe) (as featured artist)	Album of the Year	Nominated	
Grammy Awards	2022	"Good Days"	Best R&B Song	Nominated	
Grammy Awards	2023	"Beautiful" (DJ Khaled featuring Future and SZA)	Best Melodic Rap Performance	Nominated	
Grammy Awards	2024	"Kill Bill"	Record of the Year	Nominated	
Grammy Awards	2024	"Kill Bill"	Song of the Year	Nominated	
Grammy Awards	2024	"Kill Bill"	Best R&B Performance	Nominated	
Grammy Awards	2024	SOS	Album of the Year	Nominated	
Grammy Awards	2024	SOS	Best Progressive R&B Album	Won	
Grammy Awards	2024	"Ghost in the Machine" (with Phoebe Bridgers)	Best Pop Duo/Group Performance	Won	
Grammy Awards	2024	"Love Language"	Best Traditional R&B Performance	Nominated	
Grammy Awards	2024	"Snooze"	Best R&B Song	Won	
Grammy Awards	2024	"Low"	Best Melodic Rap Performance	Nominated	
Grammy Awards	2025	"Saturn"	Best R&B Performance	Nominated	
Grammy Awards	2025	"Saturn"	Best R&B Song	Won	
Grammy Awards	2026	"Luther" (with Kendrick Lamar)	Record of the Year	Won	
Grammy Awards	2026	"Luther" (with Kendrick Lamar)	Song of the Year	Nominated	
Grammy Awards	2026	"Luther" (with Kendrick Lamar)	Best Melodic Rap Performance	Won	
Grammy Awards	2026	"30 for 30" (with Kendrick Lamar)	Best Pop Duo/Group Performance	Nominated	
Grammy Awards	2026	"Crybaby"	Best Traditional R&B Performance	Nominated	
Grammy Awards	2027	Girl, Get Up (with Doechii)	Best Rap Song	Pending	
Grammy Awards	2027	Girl, Get Up (with Doechii)	Best Melodic Rap Performance	Pending	
Guild of Music Supervisors Awards	2018	"Quicksand"	Best Song/Recording Created for Television	Won	
Guild of Music Supervisors Awards	2019	"All the Stars" (with Kendrick Lamar)	Best Song/Recording Created for a Film	Nominated	
Hollywood Music in Media Awards	2018	"All the Stars" (with Kendrick Lamar)	Original Song – Sci-Fi/Fantasy/Horror Film	Won	
iHeartRadio Music Awards	2018	SZA	Best New R&B Artist	Nominated	
iHeartRadio Music Awards	2018	"Love Galore" (featuring Travis Scott)	R&B Song of the Year	Nominated	
iHeartRadio Music Awards	2018	"Homemade Dynamite" (Lorde featuring Khalid, Post Malone and SZA)	Best Remix	Nominated	
iHeartRadio Music Awards	2019	SZA	R&B Artist of the Year	Nominated	
iHeartRadio Music Awards	2022	"Kiss Me More" (Doja Cat featuring SZA)	Song of the Year	Nominated	
iHeartRadio Music Awards	2022	"Kiss Me More" (Doja Cat featuring SZA)	Best Collaboration	Nominated	
iHeartRadio Music Awards	2022	"Kiss Me More" (Doja Cat featuring SZA)	Best Music Video	Nominated	
iHeartRadio Music Awards	2022	"Kiss Me More" (Doja Cat featuring SZA)	TikTok Bop of the Year	Nominated	
iHeartRadio Music Awards	2022	"Good Days"	R&B Song of the Year	Nominated	
iHeartRadio Music Awards	2023	SZA	R&B Artist of the Year	Won	
iHeartRadio Music Awards	2023	"I Hate U"	R&B Song of the Year	Won	
iHeartRadio Music Awards	2024	SZA	Artist of the Year	Nominated	
iHeartRadio Music Awards	2024	SZA	Pop Artist of the Year	Nominated	
iHeartRadio Music Awards	2024	SZA	R&B Artist of the Year	Won	
iHeartRadio Music Awards	2024	SZA	Favorite Tour Style	Nominated	
iHeartRadio Music Awards	2024	SOS	R&B Album of the Year	Won	
iHeartRadio Music Awards	2024	"Kill Bill"	Song of the Year	Won	
iHeartRadio Music Awards	2024	"Kill Bill"	Pop Song of the Year	Nominated	
iHeartRadio Music Awards	2024	"Kill Bill"	Best Music Video	Nominated	
iHeartRadio Music Awards	2024	"Snooze"	R&B Song of the Year	Won	
iHeartRadio Music Awards	2025	SZA	Artist of the Year	Nominated	
iHeartRadio Music Awards	2025	SZA	R&B Artist of the Year	Won	
iHeartRadio Music Awards	2025	"Rich Baby Daddy" (Drake featuring Sexyy Red and SZA)	Hip-Hop Song of the Year	Nominated	
iHeartRadio Music Awards	2025	"Saturn"	Best Lyrics	Nominated	
iHeartRadio Music Awards	2026	SZA	R&B Artist of the Year	Nominated	
iHeartRadio Music Awards	2026	"Luther" (with Kendrick Lamar)	Song of the Year	Nominated	
iHeartRadio Music Awards	2026	"Luther" (with Kendrick Lamar)	Best Collaboration	Nominated	
iHeartRadio Music Awards	2026	"Luther" (with Kendrick Lamar)	Hip-Hop Song of the Year	Won	
iHeartRadio Titanium Awards	2022	"Kiss Me More" (Doja Cat featuring SZA)	Titanium Award	Won	
iHeartRadio MMVAs	2018	"All the Stars" (with Kendrick Lamar)	Best Collaboration	Nominated	
Ivor Novello Awards	2022	"Coming Back" (James Blake featuring SZA)	Best Contemporary Song	Nominated	
Juno Awards	2024	SOS	International Album of the Year	Won	
MOBO Awards	2017	SZA	Best International Act	Nominated	
MOBO Awards	2024	SZA	Best International Act	Nominated	
MTV Europe Music Awards	2017	SZA	Best Push Act	Nominated	
MTV Europe Music Awards	2021	"Kiss Me More" (Doja Cat featuring SZA)	Best Song	Nominated	
MTV Europe Music Awards	2021	"Kiss Me More" (Doja Cat featuring SZA)	Best Video	Nominated	
MTV Europe Music Awards	2021	"Kiss Me More" (Doja Cat featuring SZA)	Best Collaboration	Won	
MTV Europe Music Awards	2022	SZA	Best R&B	Nominated	
MTV Europe Music Awards	2023	"Kill Bill"	Best Song	Nominated	
MTV Europe Music Awards	2023	"Kill Bill"	Best Video	Nominated	
MTV Europe Music Awards	2023	SZA	Best Artist	Nominated	
MTV Europe Music Awards	2023	SZA	Best R&B	Nominated	
MTV Europe Music Awards	2023	SZA	Best Live	Nominated	
MTV Europe Music Awards	2024	SZA	Best R&B	Nominated	
MTV MIAW Awards	2021	"Kiss Me More" (Doja Cat featuring SZA)	Global Hit of the Year	Nominated	
MTV MIAW Awards	2023	"Kill Bill"	Viral Anthem	Nominated	
MTV MIAW Awards Brazil	2021	"Kiss Me More" (Doja Cat featuring SZA)	International Collaboration	Nominated	
MTV Video Music Awards	2017	SZA	Best New Artist	Nominated	
MTV Video Music Awards	2018	SZA	Push Artist of the Year	Nominated	
MTV Video Music Awards	2018	"The Weekend"	Best Art Direction	Nominated	
MTV Video Music Awards	2018	"All the Stars" (with Kendrick Lamar)	Best Visual Effects	Won	
MTV Video Music Awards	2019	"Just Us" (DJ Khaled featuring SZA)	Best Visual Effects	Nominated	
MTV Video Music Awards	2021	"Kiss Me More" (Doja Cat featuring SZA)	Video of the Year	Nominated	
MTV Video Music Awards	2021	"Kiss Me More" (Doja Cat featuring SZA)	Best Collaboration	Won	
MTV Video Music Awards	2021	"Good Days"	Best R&B Video	Nominated	
MTV Video Music Awards	2022	"No Love" (with Summer Walker and Cardi B)	Best R&B Video	Nominated	
MTV Video Music Awards	2023	"Kill Bill"	Video of the Year	Nominated	
MTV Video Music Awards	2023	"Kill Bill"	Song of the Year	Nominated	
MTV Video Music Awards	2023	"Kill Bill"	Best Direction	Nominated	
MTV Video Music Awards	2023	"Kill Bill"	Best Editing	Nominated	
MTV Video Music Awards	2023	"Kill Bill"	Song of Summer	Nominated	
MTV Video Music Awards	2023	"Shirt"	Best R&B Video	Won	
MTV Video Music Awards	2023	"Shirt"	Best Art Direction	Nominated	
MTV Video Music Awards	2023	SOS	Album of the Year	Nominated	
MTV Video Music Awards	2024	"Snooze"	Video of the Year	Nominated	
MTV Video Music Awards	2024	"Snooze"	Best R&B	Won	
MTV Video Music Awards	2024	SZA	Artist of the Year	Nominated	
MTV Video Music Awards	2024	"Rich Baby Daddy" (Drake featuring Sexyy Red and SZA)	Best Collaboration	Nominated	
MTV Video Music Awards	2024	"Rich Baby Daddy" (Drake featuring Sexyy Red and SZA)	Best Hip Hop	Nominated	
MTV Video Music Awards	2024	"Saturn"	Song of Summer	Nominated	
MTV Video Music Awards	2025	"Drive"	Best R&B	Nominated	
MTV Video Music Awards	2025	"Luther" (with Kendrick Lamar)	Best Collaboration	Nominated	
NAACP Image Awards	2018	SZA	Outstanding New Artist	Won	
NAACP Image Awards	2018	SZA	Outstanding Female Artist	Nominated	
NAACP Image Awards	2018	"Love Galore" (featuring Travis Scott)	Outstanding Duo, Group or Collaboration	Nominated	
NAACP Image Awards	2018	"Love Galore" (featuring Travis Scott)	Outstanding Song – Contemporary	Nominated	
NAACP Image Awards	2019	"All the Stars" (with Kendrick Lamar)	Outstanding Duo, Group or Collaboration	Won	
NAACP Image Awards	2019	"All the Stars" (with Kendrick Lamar)	Outstanding Music Video/Visual Album	Nominated	
NAACP Image Awards	2019	Black Panther	Outstanding Soundtrack/Compilation	Won	
NAACP Image Awards	2022	"Kiss Me More" (Doja Cat featuring SZA)	Outstanding Duo, Group or Collaboration (Contemporary)	Nominated	
NAACP Image Awards	2023	SZA	Outstanding Female Artist	Nominated	
NAACP Image Awards	2023	"No Love" (with Summer Walker and Cardi B)	Outstanding Duo, Group or Collaboration (Traditional)	Nominated	
NAACP Image Awards	2025	"Saturn"	Outstanding Soul/R&B Song	Nominated	
NAACP Image Awards	2026	One of Them Days	Outstanding Ensemble Cast in a Motion Picture	Nominated	
NAACP Image Awards	2026	SZA	Outstanding Female Artist	Nominated	
NAACP Image Awards	2026	"Luther" (with Kendrick Lamar)	Outstanding Music Video	Won	
NAACP Image Awards	2026	SOS Deluxe: Lana	Outstanding Album	Nominated	
Nickelodeon Kids' Choice Awards	2025	SZA	Favorite Female Artist	Won	
Nickelodeon Kids' Choice Awards	2025	"Luther" (with Kendrick Lamar)	Favorite Music Collaboration	Won	
People's Choice Awards	2020	"The Other Side" (with Justin Timberlake)	The Soundtrack Song of 2020	Nominated	
People's Choice Awards	2021	"Kiss Me More" (Doja Cat featuring SZA)	The Collaboration Song of 2021	Nominated	
People's Choice Awards	2024	SZA	The R&B Artist of the Year	Nominated	
Pollstar Awards	2024	The SOS North American Tour	Hip-Hop Tour of the Year	Nominated	
Pollstar Awards	2024	The SOS North American Tour	R&B Tour of the Year	Nominated	
Satellite Awards	2019	"All the Stars" (with Kendrick Lamar)	Best Original Song	Nominated	
Shorty Awards	2018	SZA	Best in Music	Nominated	
Songwriters Hall of Fame	2024	SZA	Hal David Starlight Award	Won	
Soul Train Music Awards	2017	Ctrl	Album of the Year	Nominated	
Soul Train Music Awards	2017	"Love Galore" (featuring Travis Scott)	Best Collaboration	Nominated	
Soul Train Music Awards	2017	SZA	Best New Artist	Won	
Soul Train Music Awards	2017	SZA	Best R&B/Soul Female Artist	Won	
Soul Train Music Awards	2018	SZA	Best R&B/Soul Female Artist	Nominated	
Soul Train Music Awards	2018	"Doves in the Wind" (featuring Kendrick Lamar)	Best Collaboration	Nominated	
Soul Train Music Awards	2018	"The Weekend"	Song of the Year	Nominated	
Soul Train Music Awards	2018	"Broken Clocks"	Video of the Year	Nominated	
Soul Train Music Awards	2018	"Broken Clocks"	The Ashford & Simpson Songwriter's Award	Nominated	
Soul Train Music Awards	2021	"Kiss Me More" (Doja Cat featuring SZA)	Best Collaboration	Nominated	
Soul Train Music Awards	2021	SZA	Best R&B/Soul Female Artist	Nominated	
Soul Train Music Awards	2022	SZA	Best R&B/Soul Female Artist	Nominated	
Soul Train Music Awards	2022	"I Hate U"	The Ashford & Simpson Songwriter's Award	Nominated	
Soul Train Music Awards	2023	SZA	Best R&B/Soul Female Artist	Won	
Soul Train Music Awards	2023	SOS	Album of the Year	Won	
Soul Train Music Awards	2023	"Kill Bill"	Video of the Year	Nominated	
Soul Train Music Awards	2023	"Kill Bill"	Song of the Year	Nominated	
Soul Train Music Awards	2023	"Snooze"	Song of the Year	Won	
Soul Train Music Awards	2023	"Snooze"	Best Dance Performance	Nominated	
Soul Train Music Awards	2023	"Snooze"	The Ashford & Simpson Songwriter's Award	Won	
Soul Train Music Awards	2023	"Kill Bill"	The Ashford & Simpson Songwriter's Award	Nominated	
Soul Train Music Awards	2023	"Special" (remix) (Lizzo featuring SZA)	Best Collaboration	Nominated	
Teen Choice Awards	2018	SZA	Choice Breakout Artist	Nominated	
Teen Choice Awards	2018	"All the Stars" (with Kendrick Lamar)	Choice R&B/Hip-Hop Song	Nominated	
Teen Choice Awards	2018	The Championship Tour (with various other Top Dawg Entertainment signees)	Choice Summer Tour	Nominated	
UK Music Video Awards	2018	"All the Stars" (with Kendrick Lamar)	Best Urban Video – International	Nominated	
UK Music Video Awards	2023	"Kill Bill"	Best R&B/Soul Video – International	Nominated	
Webby Awards	2023	SZA	Artist of the Year	Won	
XXL Awards	2026	"Luther" (with Kendrick Lamar)	Video of the Year	Won	

== Listicles ==
Name of publisher, name of listicle, year(s) listed, and placement result
Publisher	Listicle	Year(s)	Result	Ref.
Associated Press	Top Songs of the Decade	2019	Placed ("The Weekend")	
Billboard	The 100 Best Album Covers of All Time	2023	42nd (SOS)	
Billboard	The 100 Best Albums of the 2010s	2019	22nd (Ctrl)	
Billboard	The Albums with the Most Top 10 Billboard Hot 100 Hits	2024	Placed (SOS)	
Billboard	The 500 Best Pop Songs	2023	222nd ("Kill Bill")	
Billboard	75 Best Breakup Songs of All Time	2024	4th ("Kill Bill")	
Billboard	The Greatest Pop Star by Year	2023	2nd	
Billboard	The Greatest R&B Artists of All Time	2025	44th	
Business Insider	49 Best Songs Made for Movies	2020	42nd ("All the Stars")	
Business Insider	The 113 Best Songs of the Past Decade	2019	51st ("The Weekend")	
Consequence	Top 75 Albums of the Last 15 Years	2022	21st (Ctrl)	
Consequence	The Top 100 Albums of the 2010s	2019	20th (Ctrl)	
Cosmopolitan	Best Movie Soundtracks of All Time	2023	Placed (Black Panther)	
Elle	The 52 Best Songs That Defined the 2010s	2019	Placed ("The Weekend")	
Essence	The 10 Best Songs Of The Decade	2020	Placed ("Broken Clocks")	
Forbes	30 Under 30 in Music	2018	Placed	
Harper's Bazaar	50 of the Best Movie Soundtracks	2023	Placed (Black Panther)	
Little White Lies	The 50 Best Original Songs Written for Movies	2019	42nd ("All the Stars")	
Marie Claire	The 17 Best Movie Soundtracks of All Time	2021	Placed (Black Panther)	
NME	The Best Albums of the Decade: The 2010s	2019	97th (Ctrl)	
NPR Music	The 200 Greatest Songs by 21st Century Women+	2018	32nd ("The Weekend")	
Paste	The 100 Greatest Debut Albums of All Time	2023	52nd (Ctrl)	
Paste	The 100 Greatest Debut Albums of the 21st Century	2023	2nd (Ctrl)	
Paste	The 100 Best Songs of the 2010s	2019	76th ("Drew Barrymore")	
Pitchfork	The 200 Best Albums of the 2010s	2019	24th (Ctrl)	
Pitchfork	The 200 Most Important Artists of Pitchfork's First 25 Years	2021	Placed	
Refinery29	Best Movie Soundtracks of All Time	2021	Placed (Black Panther)	
Rolling Stone	500 Greatest Albums of All Time	2023	472nd (Ctrl)	
Rolling Stone	500 Greatest Albums of All Time	2023	351st (SOS)	
Rolling Stone	100 Best Debut Albums of All Time	2022	28th (Ctrl)	
Rolling Stone	The 100 Best Album Covers of All Time	2024	26th (SOS)	
Rolling Stone	500 Greatest Songs of All Time	2024	267th ("Kill Bill")	
Rolling Stone	100 Greatest R&B Songs of the 21st Century	2024	19th ("Snooze")	
Rolling Stone	200 Greatest Singers of All Time	2023	180th	
Rolling Stone	The 250 Greatest Songs of the 21st Century So Far	2025	212th ("Kiss Me More")	
Rolling Stone	The 250 Greatest Songs of the 21st Century So Far	2025	194th ("Drew Barrymore")	
Rolling Stone	The 250 Greatest Songs of the 21st Century So Far	2025	13th ("Snooze")	
Slant Magazine	The 100 Best Albums of the 2010s	2019	34th (Ctrl)	
Time	Time 100 Next (with tribute written by Lizzo)	2022	Placed	
Uproxx	The Best Debut Albums Ever	2023	Special mention (Ctrl)	
Uproxx	The Best Albums of the 2010s	2019	19th (Ctrl)	
Uproxx	The Best Songs of the 2010s	2019	41st ("Love Galore")	
