= Doechii discography =

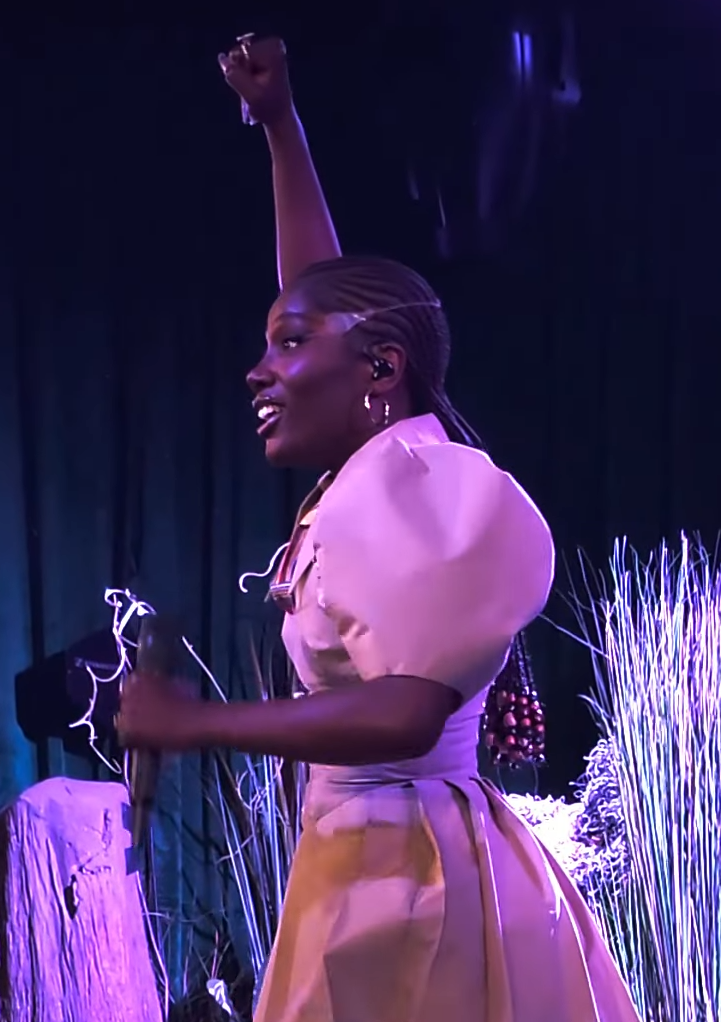
- Doechii performing in December 2024
- EPs: 3
- Singles: 31
- Music videos: 20
- Mixtapes: 2

American rapper Doechii has released two mixtapes, three extended plays (EPs), and thirty-one singles (including ten as a featured artist). She has also appeared in nineteen music videos. In 2016, Doechii began her music career by uploading her first songs on SoundCloud, an audio streaming service. Her public visibility increased in 2021 when "Yucky Blucky Fruitcake", which she released in 2020, went viral on the video-sharing platform TikTok. The newfound success landed her a 2021 collaboration with Isaiah Rashad, a rapper from the label Top Dawg Entertainment (TDE). The following year, she was signed to the label. Under TDE, Doechii released the EP She / Her / Black Bitch; it contains the remix of the single "Persuasive" with singer-songwriter and labelmate SZA. Other singles released under the label include "What It Is (Block Boy)", another song that went viral on TikTok.

From 2023 to 2024, Doechii continued to rise to fame, due to collaborations with Janelle Monáe, Katy Perry, and Tyler, the Creator. Her second mixtape, Alligator Bites Never Heal, was released in August 2024 and spawned the radio single "Denial Is a River" (2025). The song peaked at number seven on the US Hot R&B/Hip-Hop Songs chart, becoming her highest-peaking song there. The mixtape won Best Rap Album at the 67th Annual Grammy Awards; hours later, Doechii released the single "Nosebleeds" (2025) to celebrate the win. Later that year, she released the single "Anxiety", originally self-uploaded on YouTube back in 2019, on digital and streaming platforms. It was her first chart-topping single internationally; it reached number one in countries like Australia and New Zealand. "Anxiety" peaked at number nine on the US Billboard Hot 100, becoming her highest-charting single in the United States.

== Mixtapes ==
List of mixtapes, with selected details and chart positions
Title	Details	Peak chart positions										Certifications
Title	Details	US	US R&B /HH	AUS	CAN	IRE	NLD	NZ	SWI	UK	UK R&B	Certifications
Coven Music Session, Vol. 1	Released: May 15, 2019; Label: Self-released; Format: Streaming, digital download	—	—	—	—	—	—	—	—	—	—	
Alligator Bites Never Heal	Released: August 30, 2024; Label: Top Dawg, Capitol; Format: Streaming, digital download, cassette, CD, LP	10	5	29	13	40	19	19	12	40	1	RIAA: Gold; BPI: Silver; MC: Gold; RMNZ: Gold
"—" denotes a recording that did not chart or was not released in that territory.

== Extended plays ==
List of extended plays, with selected details
Title	Details
Oh the Places You'll Go	Released: November 27, 2020; Label: Five 5; Format: Streaming, digital download
Bra-Less	Released: April 3, 2021; Label: Self-released; Format: Streaming, digital download
She / Her / Black Bitch	Released: August 5, 2022; Label: Top Dawg, Capitol; Format: Streaming, digital download

== Singles ==
=== As lead artist ===
List of singles as lead artist, with selected chart positions and certifications, showing year released and album
Title	Year	Peak chart positions										Certifications	Album
Title	Year	US	US R&B /HH	AUS	CAN	IRE	NLD	NZ	SWI	UK	WW	Certifications	Album
"Girls" (Note: A reworked version of "Girls" later appeared on Bra-Less.)	2016	—	—	—	—	—	—	—	—	—	—		Non-album singles
"Doechii Potion"	2019	—	—	—	—	—	—	—	—	—	—		Non-album singles
"Spookie Coochie"	2019	—	—	—	—	—	—	—	—	—	—		Non-album singles
"Yucky Blucky Fruitcake"	2020	—	—	—	—	—	—	—	—	—	—		Oh the Places You'll Go
"What's Your Name?"	2020	—	—	—	—	—	—	—	—	—	—		Oh the Places You'll Go
"Persuasive" (solo or remix with SZA)	2022	—	— (Note: "Persuasive" did not enter the Hot R&B/Hip-Hop Songs chart, but it peaked at number 33 on the Mainstream R&B/Hip-Hop Airplay chart.)	—	—	—	—	—	—	—	—	RIAA: Gold	She / Her / Black Bitch (Note: Only the remix is included on the EP.)
"Crazy"	2022	—	—	—	—	—	—	—	—	—	—		Non-album single
"Bitch I'm Nice"	2022	—	—	—	—	—	—	—	—	—	—		She / Her / Black Bitch
"Stressed"	2022	—	—	—	—	—	—	—	—	—	—		Non-album singles
"What It Is (Block Boy)" (solo or featuring Kodak Black)	2023	29	8	100	31	95	— (Note: "What It Is (Block Boy)" did not enter the Dutch Single Top 100, but it peaked at number 5 on the Single Tip chart.)	13	—	63	77	RIAA: Platinum; ARIA: Platinum; BPI: Silver; MC: 3× Platinum; RMNZ: 2× Platinum	Non-album singles
"Universal Swamp Anthem"	2023	—	—	—	—	—	—	—	—	—	—		Non-album singles
"Booty Drop"	2023	—	—	—	—	—	—	—	—	—	—		Non-album singles
"Pacer"	2023	—	—	—	—	—	—	—	—	—	—		Non-album singles
"Alter Ego" (with JT)	2024	—	—	—	—	—	—	—	—	—	—	ARIA: Gold; BPI: Silver	Non-album singles
"MPH"	2024	—	—	—	—	—	—	—	—	—	—		Non-album singles
"Rocket"	2024	—	—	—	—	—	—	—	—	—	—		Non-album singles
"Nissan Altima"	2024	73	26	—	79	77	—	— (Note: "Nissan Altima" did not enter the NZ Top 40 Singles Chart, but it peaked at number 24 on the NZ Hot Singles Chart.)	—	66	155	RIAA: Gold; ARIA: Gold; BPI: Silver; RMNZ: Gold	Alligator Bites Never Heal
"Boom Bap"	2024	—	—	—	—	—	—	—	—	—	—		Alligator Bites Never Heal
"Denial Is a River"	2025	21	7	13	27	13	64	10	47	9	24	RIAA: Platinum; ARIA: Platinum; BPI: Gold; MC: 2× Platinum; RMNZ: Platinum	Alligator Bites Never Heal
"Nosebleeds"	2025	— (Note: "Nosebleeds" did not enter the Billboard Hot 100, but it peaked at number 13 on the Bubbling Under Hot 100 chart.)	—	—	—	—	—	— (Note: "Nosebleeds" did not enter the NZ Top 40 Singles Chart, but it peaked at number 18 on the NZ Hot Singles Chart.)	—	—	—		Non-album single
"Anxiety"	2025	9	3	1	13	4	10	1	1	3	3	RIAA: Platinum; ARIA: Platinum; BPI: Platinum; IFPI SWI: Gold; MC: 2× Platinum; RMNZ: Platinum	Alligator Bites Never Heal (Extended)
"Girl, Get Up" (featuring SZA)	2025	57	12	—	81	—	—	— (Note: "Girl, Get Up" did not enter the NZ Top 40 Singles Chart, but it peaked at number 3 on the NZ Hot Singles Chart.)	—	79	—		Non-album single
"Runway" (with Lady Gaga)	2026	50	—	90	36	80	— (Note: "Runway" did not enter the Dutch Single Top 100, but peaked at number 16 on the Dutch Single Tip chart.)	— (Note: "Runway" did not enter the NZ Top 40 Singles Chart, but peaked at number 5 on the NZ Hot Singles Chart.)	—	32	70		The Devil Wears Prada 2
"—" denotes a recording that did not chart or was not released in that territory.

=== As featured artist ===
List of singles as featured artist, with selected chart positions, showing year released and album
Title	Year	Peak chart positions										Certifications	Album
Title	Year	US	US R&B /HH	AUS	CAN	IRE	NLD	NZ	SWI	UK	WW	Certifications	Album
"Afro Blues" (Mike Escanor featuring Doechii)	2020	—	—	—	—	—	—	—	—	—	—		Non-album singles
"Right Now" (Jayprob featuring Doechii)	2020	—	—	—	—	—	—	—	—	—	—		Non-album singles
"Till' the World" (Pee Wee Callins featuring Doechii)	2021	—	—	—	—	—	—	—	—	—	—		Non-album singles
"Wat U Sed" (Isaiah Rashad featuring Doechii and Kal Banx)	2021	—	—	—	—	—	—	—	—	—	—		The House Is Burning
"Trampoline" (David Guetta and Afrojack featuring Missy Elliott, Bia, and Doechii)	2022	—	—	—	—	—	—	—	—	—	—		Non-album singles
"Xtasy" (remix) (Ravyn Lenae featuring Doechii)	2022	—	—	—	—	—	—	—	—	—	—		Non-album singles
"Anxiety" (Sleepy Hallow featuring Doechii)	2023	45	11	14	25	12	24	5	4	15	21	RIAA: Gold; BPI: Silver; MC: Platinum; RMNZ: Platinum	Boy Meets World
"I'm His, He's Mine" (Katy Perry featuring Doechii)	2024	— (Note: "I'm His, He's Mine" did not enter the Billboard Hot 100, but it peaked at number 24 on the Bubbling Under Hot 100 chart.)	—	—	—	—	—	— (Note: "I'm His, He's Mine" did not enter the NZ Top 40 Singles Chart, but it peaked at number 8 on the NZ Hot Singles Chart.)	—	—	—		143
"I Hate Your Ex-Girlfriend" (Banks featuring Doechii)	2024	—	—	—	—	—	—	—	—	—	—		Off with Her Head
"ExtraL" (Jennie featuring Doechii)	2025	75	—	64	58	74	—	— (Note: "ExtraL" did not enter the NZ Top 40 Singles Chart, but it peaked at number 5 on the NZ Hot Singles Chart.)	—	37	18	RIAA: Gold	Ruby
"Timeless" (remix) (The Weeknd featuring Playboi Carti and Doechii)	2025	—	—	—	—	—	—	—	—	—	—		Non-album single
"Beat a Bitch Up" (Alemeda featuring Doechii)	2025	—	—	—	—	—	—	—	—	—	—		But What The Hell Do I Know
"—" denotes a recording that did not chart or was not released in that territory.

== Other charted songs ==
List of other charted songs, with selected chart positions and certifications, showing year released and album
Title	Year	Peak chart positions				Certifications	Album
Title	Year	US	US R&B /HH	CAN	WW	Certifications	Album
"Catfish"	2024	— (Note: "Catfish" did not enter the Billboard Hot 100, but it peaked at number 12 on the Bubbling Under Hot 100 chart.)	50	—	—		Alligator Bites Never Heal
"Balloon" (Tyler, the Creator featuring Doechii)	2024	56	20	68	90	RIAA: Gold	Chromakopia
"—" denotes a recording that did not chart or was not released in that territory.

== Guest appearances ==
List of non-single guest appearances, showing year released, other artists, and album
Title	Year	Other artist(s)	Album	Ref.
"Life Balance"	2018	Phaze Jones, Spirit.Gze	Its Hard to Explain	
"Emma II"	2018	YZM, Ahri, Milli Moon	NuZxmbies	
"On My Way"	2020	PyroThePoet	Breakthrough 22	
"Sayonara"	2020	YZM, Melanie	Rage	
"Girls Night Out"	2022	Babyface	Girls Night Out	
"Pro Freak"	2022	Smino, Fatman Scoop	Luv 4 Rent	
"Phenomenal"	2023	Janelle Monáe	The Age of Pleasure	
"I Don't Trust You!"	2023	Reason, Junii	Porches	
"Believe"	2024	Zacari	Bliss	
"I, Myself & Me"	2024	Ab-Soul	Soul Burger	
"Egypt" (remix)	2025	Westside Gunn	—N/a	
"Robbery"	2026	ASAP Rocky	Don't Be Dumb	
"Babygirl"	2026	Ravyn Lenae	Blue Island	

== Music videos ==
List of music video appearances, indicating, where applicable, the associated album, directors, and other performers
Title	Year	Other performer(s)	Director(s)	Album	Ref.
"Spookie Coochie"	2020	—N/a	Kevin Joczilla Jacques	Non-album single	
"Yucky Blucky Fruitcake"	2020	—N/a	Kevin Joczilla Jacques	Oh the Places You'll Go	
"What's Your Name?"	2020	—N/a	Kevin Joczilla Jacques, Oyinda	Oh the Places You'll Go	
"Girls"	2021	—N/a	Kevin Joczilla Jacques, Oyinda	Bra-Less	
"Persuasive"	2022	—N/a	Omar Jones	Non-album singles	
"Crazy"	2022	—N/a	C. Prinz	Non-album singles	
"Persuasive" (remix)	2022	SZA	Sara Lacombe	She / Her / Black Bitch	
"What It Is (Block Boy)"	2023	Kodak Black	Omar Jones	Non-album singles	
"Booty Drop"	2023	—N/a	Doechii	Non-album singles	
"Pacer"	2023	—N/a	Nikko Lamere	Non-album singles	
"Alter Ego"	2024	JT	Omar Jones	Non-album singles	
"Rocket"	2024	—N/a	Jack Begert	Non-album singles	
"Nissan Altima"	2024	—N/a	James Mackel	Alligator Bites Never Heal	
"I'm His, He's Mine"	2024	Katy Perry	Torso	143	
"I Hate Your Ex-Girlfriend"	2024	Banks	Charlie Denis	Off with Her Head	
"Denial Is a River"	2025	—N/a	Carlos Acosta, James Mackel	Alligator Bites Never Heal	
"ExtraL"	2025	Jennie	Cole Bennett	Ruby	
"Anxiety"	2025	—N/a	James Mackel	Alligator Bites Never Heal (Extended)	
"Girl, Get Up"	2026	—N/a	James Mackel	Non-album single	
"Bombs"	2026	—N/a	Doechii	Non-album single	
