= TwoAM =

Single by SZA
- Written: 2016
- Released: May 18, 2016
- Recorded: 2016
- Studio: The Lake House (Michigan)
- Genre: Downtempo
- Length: 4:02
- Label: Top Dawg
- Songwriters: Solána Imani Rowe; Cody Fayne; Aubrey Graham; Jahron Anthony Brathwaite; Noah James Shebib
- Producers: ThankGod4Cody; Carter Lang; Scum

SZA singles chronology
"Sobriety" (2014)	"TwoAM" (2016)	"Drew Barrymore" (2017)

Audio
- "2AM" on YouTube

"TwoAM" is a song by American singer-songwriter SZA. It is a remix of PartyNextDoor's 2016 single "Come and See Me" featuring Drake, whom SZA briefly dated in 2009. A downtempo song with an R&B instrumental, "TwoAM" is about a dysfunctional couple portrayed in "Come and See Me" and is written from the perspective of the woman in the relationship. She sings about her conflicted feelings for a neglectful boyfriend who values her only for sex; on one hand, she recognizes she must leave him, but on the other, she cannot bring herself to stop being attracted to him.

Released as a standalone single on SoundCloud on May 18, 2016, the song is part of a years-long series of indirect interactions between SZA and Drake in which they referenced each other in their music. Critics received "TwoAM" positively, with praise directed towards the vulnerable tone and what they deemed a faithful recreation of the original song's quality. It got its official release on June 9, 2022, as a song on the deluxe edition of SZA's debut studio album, Ctrl (2017), after it was scrapped from the standard version's tracklist.

== Background ==
After self-releasing two extended plays (EPs) from 2012 to 2013, American singer-songwriter SZA signed with the record label Top Dawg Entertainment headed by rapper Terrence "Punch" Henderson, whom she first met in 2011 during a concert sponsored by a street company where SZA was working at the time. Her first EP under the label was Z (2014), preceded by the single "Child's Play" (2014) featuring Chance the Rapper. After the release of Z, SZA began work on her debut studio album, which had the working title A. During this time, SZA released the standalone single "Sobriety" (2014) and co-wrote songs for other artists such as Nicki Minaj and Rihanna.

Back in 2009, SZA had a brief relationship with Canadian rapper Drake, and after their break-up, they began to reference each other in their music back-and-forth, through lyrics and song titles. Moises Mendez II of Time called their behavior an example of subliminal messaging. Their series of interactions began with SZA's "Child's Play", the title of which Drake later used for a track from his 2016 album Views. While the completion and release of A was being teased through a series of snippets, SZA released a remix of a song featuring Drake, titled "Come and See Me" (2016), by PartyNextDoor.

== Music and lyrics ==
"Come and See Me" is about a man who calls a woman late at night to invite her for sex. In "TwoAM", SZA shifts the perspective away from the man and assumes the role of the woman in the call, offering more seductive lyrics compared to the original. The line "It's after 2 a.m. and that's asking a lot of you right now" is where the title of SZA's song originates. In "TwoAM", yearning thoughts of the man keep the woman awake at night, hence the title.

"TwoAM" inverts the story in "Come and See Me". As observed by Erin Ashley Simon of Revolt, while PartyNextDoor's character insists that the woman "come and see [him] for once", SZA's rejects him and tells him that he should go see her instead: "it's my time, it's your turn." In "Come and See Me", the man fails to properly care for the woman and makes her feel guilty for his own faults; in "TwoAM", she eventually acknowledges that he values her only for casual sex and realizes that she must end the relationship. However, her attraction to him persists, making her struggle to do so: "All this time I've been playin' your side / I could've done better shit with my life." She tells herself that if she continued to stay, she would feel more "fucked up".

"TwoAM" was produced by ThankGod4Cody, Carter Lang, and Scum, and it was recorded in Lang's cottage near Lake Michigan. (Note: Named in the album liner notes as The Lake House; some songs in the album like "Love Galore" and "Broken Clocks" were recorded here) The song is downtempo and features a stripped-down, R&B-influenced instrumental, a reproduced version of the one in "Come and See Me". Meanwhile, the outro features guitar strums and the sound of chirping birds, showing a snippet of an unreleased SZA song, "Inside Man". In it, she sings, "I might be thirsty for you, how can you blame me?", and ends with "Do you need me?"

== Release ==
"TwoAM" was surprise-released through Top Dawg Entertainment's SoundCloud account on May 18, 2016. It was slated to appear on A, now named Ctrl (2017), but intense anxiety surrounding the album's lengthy wait led SZA to scrap it from the final tracklist. It received an official release on June 9, 2022, as a track on the deluxe edition of Ctrl. The song peaked at number 45 on the US Hot R&B/Hip-Hop Songs chart. (Note: Charted as "2AM", with number two written in numerals instead of spelled out)

Critics Marc Hogan of Pitchfork and Sydnee Monday of NPR were positive about the theme of vulnerability in "TwoAM". In a review of Ctrl's standard edition, Monday commented that "TwoAM" had connected her to SZA's music more than Z because it was less heavy on metaphors and more grounded and honest. Meanwhile, Edwin Ortiz of Complex and M. Musa of The Source believed that it faithfully recreated the quality of the original "Come and See Me". Sydney Gore of Nylon, referencing the last line of the song, and Melissa Locker of Elle wrote that "TwoAM" would leave listeners very excited for more SZA music. In a 2025 ranking of her discography, The Guardian critic Alexis Petridis rated "TwoAM" as her 16th-best song.

== Credits ==
Adapted from Billboard and Rap-Up

Recording and management

- Recorded at The Lake House (Michigan)

Personnel

- Solána Imani Rowe (SZA) – vocals, songwriting
- Cody Fayne (ThankGod4Cody) – songwriting, production
- Aubrey Graham (Drake) – songwriting
- Jahron Anthony Brathwaite (PartyNextDoor) – songwriting
- Noah James Shebib – songwriting
- Carter Lang – production
- Scum – production

== Charts ==
Chart performance for "TwoAM"
Chart (2022)	Peak position
New Zealand Hot Singles (RMNZ)	15
US Hot R&B/Hip-Hop Songs (Billboard)	45

== Certifications ==
Certifications for "TwoAM"
Region	Certification	Certified units/sales
United States (RIAA)	Gold	500,000^{‡}
^{‡} Sales+streaming figures based on certification alone.
