= Save the Day (SZA song) =

2026 single by SZA

- 10-inch vinyl cover art

Single by SZA

from the album Hoppers (Original Motion Picture Soundtrack)
- Released: February 20, 2026
- Length: 2:52
- Label: Walt Disney
- Composers: SZA; Ben Lovett; Rob Bisel
- Lyricist: SZA
- Producers: Rob Bisel; Ben Lovett

SZA singles chronology
"Girl, Get Up" (2025)	"Save the Day" (2026)	"Boy in Red" (2026)

Lyric video
- "Save the Day" on YouTube

"Save the Day" is a song by American singer-songwriter SZA. It was released on February 20, 2026, by Walt Disney Records. The song was created for the soundtrack of the 2026 Pixar film Hoppers, appearing specifically on the end credits.

"Save the Day" is built around a smooth, ornate piano melody, composed with a melancholic and inspirational sound in mind. The lyrics reflect the film's plot, which centers on the rescuing of an animal habitat from human destruction. In the song, SZA sings about being inspired to change the world around her, expressing her strong determination to succeed.

== Background ==
Director Daniel Chong wanted the end credits of Pixar's Hoppers (2026) to feature an original song. Many of the placeholder tracks he used while waiting for it to get made were by SZA. These included the singles "Good Days" (2020) and "Saturn" (2024). Chong explained in a press panel that he worked with those songs because they matched the mood of what he wanted the film's finale to have: a mix of melancholy and joy.

Chong's interest in SZA prompted him to contact her about possibly making a song for the film. She accepted the offer, writing and recording the track after she finished co-headlining Kendrick Lamar's 2025 Grand National Tour. (Note: Her last show on the Grand National Tour was on August 9, 2025.) Chong said about their interaction: "I think there was an intuitiveness in talking with SZA that when she saw [Hoppers], I think she immediately knew what the movie needed. She understood [the protagonist] as a character".

== Music and production ==
"Save the Day" (2026)
Built around a smooth piano melody, the song's composition was made to reflect the melancholic and inspirational mood of the film's finale.

"Save the Day" was composed with a melancholic and inspirational sound in mind, similar to "Good Days" and "Saturn". The song is built around a smooth, ornate piano melody by Ben Lovett, member of the folk rock band Mumford & Sons and one of the song's producers. Other instruments include bass, guitar, synthesizers, and programmed drums, provided by co-producer Rob Bisel. Lovett and Bisel are credited alongside SZA as the song's composers.

== Lyrics ==
"Save the Day" explores themes of hope. The lyrics reflect the plot of Hoppers, which involves saving an animal habitat from human destruction. (Note: Hoppers is about a young woman, Mabel, who transfers her mind into a robotic beaver, allowing her to communicate with animals and save their habitat.) SZA is the song's sole lyricist.

In the melancholic verses, SZA questions whether she is "a fool" for wanting to change the world and being nostalgic about the past. She reflects on being motivated to change and learn from her past mistakes: "Can we move on? It's all so heavy, need more strength to carry on."

In the more joyous chorus, she sings about wanting to save the day and expressing her intense determination to succeed. The lyrics read: "Caught in the friction, I'm on a mission / Here's to hopin' there's still a way". In the outro, she promises someone in dire need of rescue that she will come back for them: "I'll be back for you, babe / Hold it down to the grave / I'll be back for you."

== Release ==
"Save the Day" was released on streaming services on February 20, 2026, by Walt Disney Records. The entire song was previewed two days earlier on SiriusXM's Disney Hits channel. Pixar also posted a 16-second snippet of it on social media.

The song was released on 10-inch vinyl on March 20, 2026. The vinyl record's shape resembles the silhouette of the film's protagonist, Mabel.

== Credits ==
Adapted from the 10-inch vinyl's liner notes

- SZA (Note: Appears courtesy of Top Dawg Entertainment and RCA Records) – vocals, lyrics, music
- Rob Bisel – music, production, engineering, mixing, bass, guitar, synthesizers, drum programming
- Ben Lovett (Note: Appears courtesy of Island Records) – music, production, piano
- Caleb Laven – engineering
- Walker Steele – assistant mixing
- Dale Becker – mastering

== Charts ==
Chart performance for "Save the Day"
Chart (2026)	Peak position
Japan Hot Overseas (Billboard Japan)	10
New Zealand Hot Singles (RMNZ)	26
UK Physical Singles (OCC)	59

== Release history ==
Release dates and formats for "Save the Day"
Region	Date	Format(s)	Label(s)	Ref.
Various	February 20, 2026	Digital download; streaming	Walt Disney	
Various	March 20, 2026	10-inch vinyl	Walt Disney	
