= Hoppers (soundtrack) =

Hoppers (Original Motion Picture Soundtrack)

Soundtrack album by Mark Mothersbaugh
- Released: March 6, 2026
- Recorded: 2025–2026
- Studios: Newman Scoring Stage, Fox Studio Lot, Los Angeles
- Genres: Film score; film soundtrack
- Length: 47:27
- Label: Walt Disney
- Producers: Mark Mothersbaugh; Rob Bisel; Ben Lovett; Matt Walker (exec.)

Mark Mothersbaugh chronology
A Minecraft Movie (2025)	Hoppers (2026)

Singles from Hoppers (Original Motion Picture Soundtrack)
- 1. "Save the Day" Released: February 20, 2026

Hoppers (Original Motion Picture Soundtrack) is the soundtrack album to the 2026 Disney/Pixar film Hoppers directed by Daniel Chong. The original score is composed by Mark Mothersbaugh and featured an original song "Save the Day" performed by SZA which released on February 20, 2026. The soundtrack was released through Walt Disney Records on March 6, 2026.

== Development ==
"All the companies have their own personalities, but Pixar is unique, [...] They're very communicative. There are studios where you'll walk down the hallway with a director and go past people, and they won't acknowledge you — and the director will say, 'Yeah, we're having a meeting tomorrow', but he doesn't even look up and say hi. Pixar is very friendly and feels like a family."

— Mark Mothersbaugh on working with Pixar

Although Mothersbaugh worked in several animated feature films and television productions from various productions, Hoppers was his maiden composition for a Pixar full-length animated feature who considered it to be "lucky to have picked him". He previously composed the Toy Story Toons short Hawaiian Vacation (2011) and several Cars Toons shorts for the studio. On his working relationship with Chong, Mothersbaugh said "The first time you work with a director, they'll say, 'I want this to be dark,' or 'I want this to be sad,' and you have to guess what they mean by those words. You start giving them sketches and listen to their responses, and it always makes the second film easier because when they're saying things like 'make it romantic,' or 'make it scary,' you know what those things mean."

Mothersbaugh worked on the film score on and off for six months while touring with Devo utilizing on the downtime between concerts. He took a laptop and keyboard during the touring so that he could write the score at his hotel room. Mothersbaugh said that the style of constrained music writing process where he would write the score, discuss with the musicians and then record it which could be used in the film, which was the tradition since the 1990s but after COVID-19 pandemic as people were not coming to the studio, the timelines extended to six to nine months and a lot of back and forth happened though at times not benefitting the music, where "sometimes it makes the films better, but sometimes you come full circle, and they go right back to the music you wrote in the beginning, and that's what you end up putting in the film." He recalled his experience on a weekly basis he worked in Pee-wee's Playhouse (1986–1990) where he would get an episode tape, writing the music based on it, recording it and sending that music to the producers in time for them to put the music into the episode before it aires on Saturday morning, considering it to be "exciting" compared to what he worked on Devo, spending months writing and recording an album.

Mothersbaugh was first tasked to write themes for the couple of the main characters which could be used in the rest of the film, since the temp tracks did not work together as opposed to one scene at a time, Mothersbaugh convinced Chong to have a recurring theme appearing throughout the film. He emphasized on the use of orchestral music, especially in animation films and hence a 90-piece orchestra was responsible for recording the score at the Newman Scoring Stage. Though Mothersbaugh composed a lively, dramatic music for the film, he considered an important sequence between Mabel and her grandmother was one of his favorites as they share a lovely bond, while sitting at the mound looking at the glade and was a quiet before the music plays bringin that scene to life.

== Release ==
The end credits featured the original song, "Save the Day" written, co-composed and performed by SZA, with additional music production and composition by Rob Bisel and Ben Lovett. The song was released as a single on February 20, 2026. The album featuring 26 tracks was released under the Walt Disney Records label on March 6, 2026.

== Reception ==
David Rooney of The Hollywood Reporter called it a "spirited" score. George M. Thomas of Akron Beacon Journal called it a "complementary soundtrack from Akron native and DEVO frontman Mark Mothersbaugh". Christopher Connor of The Upcoming wrote "Mark Mothersbaugh, no stranger to animation, having worked on the Lego Movie series and Mitchells vs The Machines, provides one of the most memorable Pixar scores in a few years, leaning into jazz more than their usual scores in a refreshing way."

== Track listing ==
All music is composed by Mark Mothersbaugh, except where indicated.

No.	Title	Lyrics	Music	Artist(s)	Length
1.	"Save the Day"	SZA	SZA; Rob Bisel; Ben Lovett	SZA	2:52
2.	"The First Hop"				1:03
3.	"Mabel on a Mission"				1:23
4.	"Grandma Tanaka"				2:13
5.	"Beaver Rescue"				2:30
6.	"Sorry Doc, I'll Bring It Right Back"				0:54
7.	"Lab Chaos"				1:21
8.	"Almost Owl Lunch"				0:39
9.	"Going to See the King"				1:50
10.	"The Tree Is Loud"				2:48
11.	"Like We Never Left"				0:48
12.	"Kings Arrive"				3:00
13.	"Escape the Lodge"				2:12
14.	"Titus the Insect King"				0:56
15.	"Jerry vs. Shark"				3:13
16.	"Not Just Any Human"				1:36
17.	"We Have to Work Together"				1:08
18.	"Jerry Takes the Stage"				0:42
19.	"Plan B"				0:51
20.	"Robot-Monster"				1:41
21.	"Destroying the Dam"				3:13
22.	"Aftermath"				1:55
23.	"Epilogue"				2:16
24.	"Mabel's Suite"				2:52
25.	"Work That Shell"				2:04
26.	"Into the Woods"				1:27
Total length:					47:27

== Personnel ==
Credits adapted from Film Music Reporter:

- Music composer and producer: Mark Mothersbaugh
- Additional music: Tim Jones, Peter Bateman, Sunna Wehrmeijer
- Executive music producer: Matt Walker
- Supervising music editor: Dominick Certo, M.P.S.E.
- Music editors: Rachel Bigelow, Justin Pearson
- Assistant music editor: Veronica Toledo
- Score editor: Brooke Villanyi
- Recording studios: Newman Scoring Stage, Fox Studio Lot, Mutato Muzika
- Recording and mixing: Alan Meyerson
- Digital recordist: Larry Mah
- Conductor and orchestrator: Tim Davies
- Additional orchestrations: Jeremy Levy, Ryan Humphrey, Lorenzo Carrano, Peter Bateman
- Orchestra contractor: Peter Rotter
- Choir contractor: Jasper Randall
- Score coordinator and mutato engineering: Seth Atkins Horan
- Vice president of music production: Anrew Page
- Senior vice president of music business affairs: Donna Cole-Brule
- Counsel music business affairs: Cristina Gabrielyan
- Manager of music production: Lauren Harrold
- Music clearance director: Debra Roberts
- Music clearance administrator: Ruben Wynn
- Executive music assistant: Jill Heffley
- Music production coordinator: Caleb Hsu
- Music librarians: Trevor Motycka, Victor Pesavento
- Scoring crew: Tim Lauber, Stacey Robinson, Damon Tedesco, Jim Wright, Hoss Yekband
- Music preparation: Bethany Brinton, Andrew Conrad, Dalton Daniel, Lucas Flynn, Kim Foskett, Robert Franken, Timothy J. Gelhaus, Emily Graham, Mark Graham, Andrew Hauschild, Riley Hughes, Jonathan Hughes, Alex Jackson, Ryn Jorgensen, Sean Kisch, Robert Lewandoswki, Andres Montero Avila, Rowan Penn, Matt Ridge, Roger Satorra, Daniel Swanberg, Patrick Tice-Carroll, Philip Timofeyev, Samantha van der Sluis

Featured instrumentalists

- Drums and percussion programming: Seth Atkins Horan
- Bass: Rob Bisel
- Guitar, synthesizers: Rob Bisel, Mark Mothersbaugh
- Drums: Jeff Friedl
- Percussion: M.B. Gordy
- Piano: Ben Lovett
- Electric bass: Matt McJunkins
- Upright bass: Paul Morin
- Featured vocalists: Jon Hall, Jenny Karr, Suzanne Waters
