= Drew Barrymore (SZA song) =

Single by SZA

from the album Ctrl
- Released: January 13, 2017
- Length: 3:51
- Label: Top Dawg
- Songwriters: Solána Rowe; Carter Lang; Tyran Donaldson; Macie Stewart; Terrence Henderson
- Producers: Carter Lang; Scum

SZA singles chronology
"TwoAM" (2016)	"Drew Barrymore" (2017)	"Love Galore" (2017)

Music video
- "Drew Barrymore" on YouTube

"Drew Barrymore" is a song by American singer-songwriter SZA, released as the lead single from her debut major-label album, Ctrl (2017). The Dave Meyers-directed music video was released on June 20, 2017, and includes a cameo from actress Drew Barrymore, the song's namesake.

== Background ==
After self-releasing two EPs from 2012 to 2013, American singer-songwriter SZA signed with the record label Top Dawg Entertainment headed by rapper Terrence "Punch" Henderson, with whom she had prior contact starting 2011 during a concert sponsored by a street company where SZA was working at the time. Her first EP under the label was Z (2014), preceded by the single "Child's Play" (2014) featuring Chance the Rapper. After the release of Z, SZA began work on her debut studio album, which had the working title A. During the time, SZA released the standalone singles "Sobriety" (2014) and "TwoAM" (2016), alongside co-writing songs for other artists such as Nicki Minaj and Rihanna.

The idea for the song came from parallels between SZA's upbringing and Barrymore's film roles, in which she always played an outcast or an "oddball." In an interview with USA Today, SZA revealed she wrote Barrymore a "long, dramatic letter" about "how all her movies shaped me." She detailed how Barrymore's character in Never Been Kissed, nicknamed Josie Grossie, "made me feel better about being awkward and having crooked teeth and just being myself." Her manager never sent Barrymore the letter but reached out to her team. In a brief interview with the Recording Academy, SZA explained that "she connected to Josie Grossie, like [she was] Josie Grossie": "Film just really takes me to a weird place where I'm making a soundtrack to a movie I've already seen that already has a soundtrack, but this is what that movie means to me."

== Critical reception ==
In a 2025 ranking of SZA's discography, The Guardian critic Alexis Petridis rated "Drew Barrymore" as her fifth-best song. He praised both the songwriting for its relatability and candidness, and the composition for the usage of "spare beats [and] twanging guitar."

== Music video ==
Directed by Dave Meyers, the music video for the song was released on June 20, 2017.

The music video for Drew Barrymore begins with a shot of the New York City skyline, then pans to the inside of a messy apartment littered with wine glasses and people. SZA is shown gazing up into the camera from the couch. SZA and a group of people enter the streets of New York, going across a crosswalk and into a pizza place. The group is then seen on the floor above a sign that says "SELF DEFINED." The day turns into night, and the camera cuts to SZA and her friends sledding. The scene then transitions into SZA wearing only a pink veil squatting in front of a wall of washing machines. SZA is then shown to be in front of a cafe with her friends again while an extremely tall man walks by. The group goes into an apartment, and people start dancing. The camera once again pans to SZA being alone. She takes a smoke outside on a stairwell. Drew Barrymore makes a cameo walking up the stairs, smiling past SZA. The video then transitions into the apartment where SZA is seen in the bathroom, smoking surrounded by other people. A person is shown hovering above the toilet, appearing to be naked. The camera continues to switch between SZA being alone and scenes of people in the apartment kissing, smoking, etc. The video ends with SZA and the group on top of a building, talking and hugging.

== Live performances ==
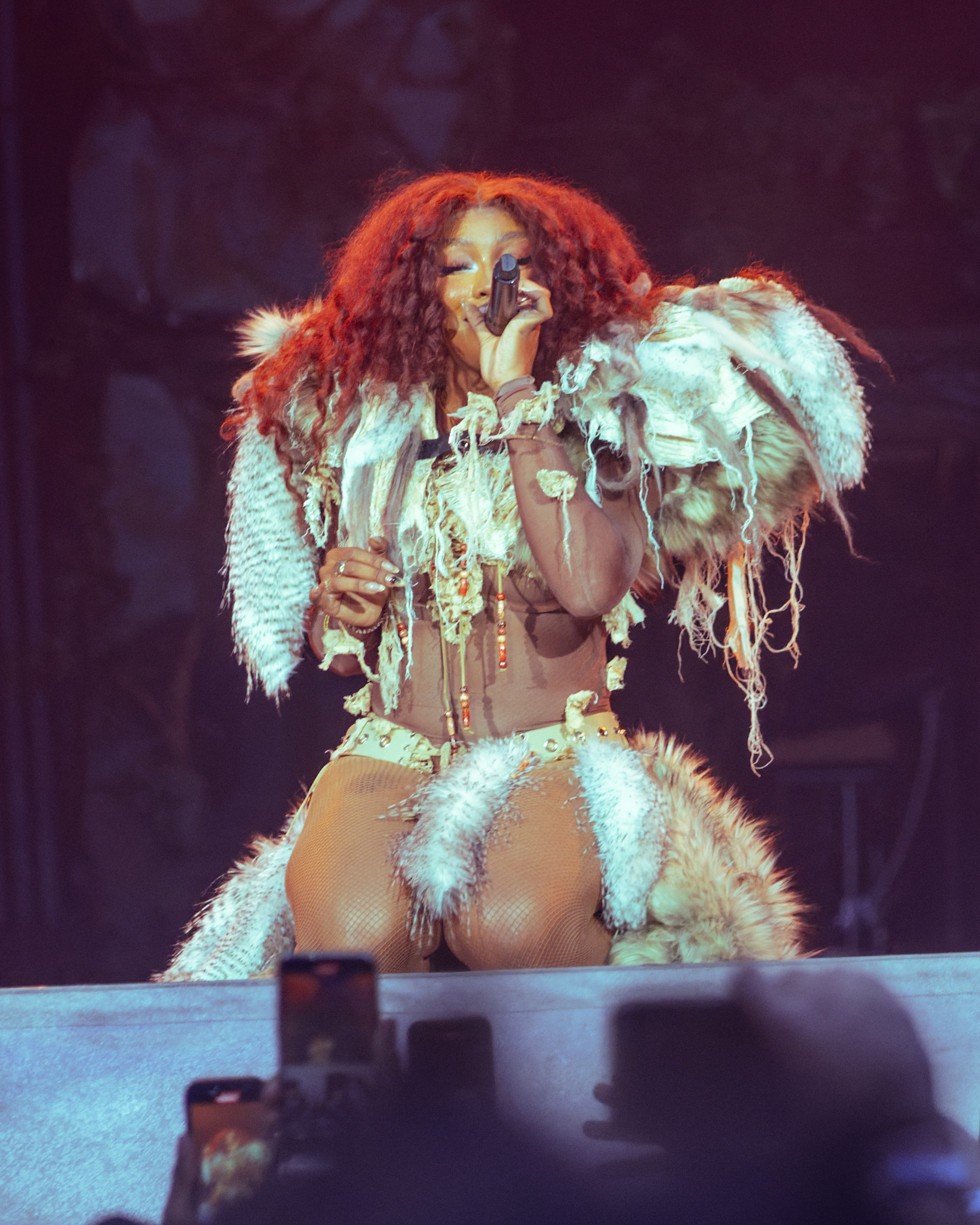
SZA performing "Drew Barrymore" on the Grand National Tour in London

SZA debuted the song on Jimmy Kimmel Live!, which was met with acclaim from Barrymore herself. She also planned to perform it on Barrymore's Daytime Talk show The Drew Barrymore Show prior to the launch of her then-untitled second album in 2020, but the appearance never materialized. In 2025, SZA performed the song in select stops of her co-headlining Grand National Tour, such as Toronto and London.

== Credits ==
Adapted from the liner notes of Ctrl

Recording and management

- Recorded at EngineEars Studios
- Mastered at Bernie Grundman Mastering (Los Angeles)

Personnel

- Solána Rowe (SZA) – vocals, songwriting
- Carter Lang – songwriting, production
- Tyran Donaldson (Scum) – songwriting, production
- Macie Stewart – songwriting, strings
- Terrence Henderson – songwriting
- Mommy (Audrey Rowe) – skit
- Prophit – engineering
- Derek "MixedbyAli" Ali – mixing
- Mike Bozzi – mastering

== Certifications ==
Certifications for "Drew Barrymore"
Region	Certification	Certified units/sales
Brazil (Pro-Música Brasil)	Gold	30,000^{‡}
Canada (Music Canada)	Platinum	80,000^{‡}
United Kingdom (BPI)	Gold	400,000^{‡}
United States (RIAA)	3× Platinum	3,000,000^{‡}
^{‡} Sales+streaming figures based on certification alone.
