= Girl, Get Up =

2025 single by Doechii featuring SZA

Single by Doechii featuring SZA
- Released: December 29, 2025
- Genre: Hip-hop
- Length: 3:08
- Label: Top Dawg; Capitol
- Songwriters: Jaylah Hickmon; Solána Rowe; Darius Scott; Jahlil Gunter; Bryan Williams; Charles Hugo; Gene Thornton; Pharrell Williams; Terrence Thornton
- Producer: Jay Versace

Doechii singles chronology
"Beat a Bitch Up" (2025)	"Girl, Get Up" (2025)	"Runway" (2026)

SZA singles chronology
"PT Cruiser" (2025)	"Girl, Get Up" (2025)	"Save the Day" (2026)

Music video
- "Girl, Get Up" on YouTube

"Girl, Get Up" is a song by American rapper Doechii, featuring American singer-songwriter SZA. It was surprise-released on December 29, 2025, by Top Dawg Entertainment and Capitol Records. Doechii made the song as a response to accusations that she was an industry plant, or someone who became famous seemingly out of nowhere because of influential people in the music industry.

"Girl, Get Up" is a hip-hop song combining guitars, drum grooves, and mellow synthesizers; it samples the 2002 single "What Happened to That Boy" (2002) by Birdman and Clipse. In the lyrics, Doechii raps that the industry plant accusations come from misogynists and racists who downplay her years of hard work. She derides streamers and bloggers, likely including Adin Ross, for peddling the backlash. She draws attention to her various career accomplishments, including a Kendrick Lamar co-sign; SZA appears in the song's hook to sing words of affirmation.

Various critics wrote positively about "Girl, Get Up". They praised its lyrics as being direct and incisive, connecting the song to wider discussions of misogynoir in hip-hop. The song debuted and peaked on number 57 on the US Billboard Hot 100; it also charted in Canada, Nigeria, and the UK. The music video, directed by James Mackel, features Doechii dancing in a yacht and sitting on a stadium rooftop.

== Background ==
American rapper Doechii rose to mainstream fame in 2024 with the release of her mixtape Alligator Bites Never Heal, which won a Grammy award for Best Rap Album. Since then, she began receiving allegations of being an "industry plant", or someone who becomes famous seemingly out of nowhere because of industry connections, from Internet personalities like streamer Adin Ross. Her music became a subject of online backlash as well. Her discography was called "Harriet Tubman music" or "slave music" after a TV performance of "Boiled Peanuts" – named after a snack introduced to the Southern United States by slaves from West Africa – went viral on social media. Doechii was accused of being in an "anti-male agenda" due to an offhand remark she made on First We Feast about heterosexual men being a "red flag".

Discussions about the backlash's sociopolitical factors were published in several media outlets. (Note: Such as in Rolling Stone, Billboard, and the Canadian Broadcasting Corporation.) Andre Gee of Rolling Stone wrote that the industry plant accusations were not only a "fundamental misunderstanding of how the [music] industry works", but also fueled by misogyny, queerphobia, and racism. Gee was critical of the "slave music" and "anti-male agenda" labels and said that they were similarly misogynistic and racist. Angie Martoccio, also from Rolling Stone, said that calling Doechii an industry plant was erroneous because she had been making music for over a decade. She also noted that these derogatory remarks have been directed disproportionately towards female musicians.

== Music and lyrics ==
Doechii created "Girl, Get Up" as a response to the aforementioned online backlash. It is a hip-hop song featuring American singer-songwriter SZA, with whom Doechii first collaborated in 2022. The song samples Birdman and Clipse's "What Happened to That Boy" (2002), combining mellow synthesizers with the sample's guitars and drum grooves. Doechii and SZA co-wrote "Girl, Get Up" with Darius "Dixson" Scott and its producer, Jay Versace. (Note: Bryan Williams (Birdman), Gene Thorton (Clipse's Malice), Terrence Thorton (Clipse's Pusha T), Charles Hugo (Chad Hugo), and Pharrell Williams are credited as writers of "Girl, Get Up" due to its sampling "What Happened to That Boy", which the five co-wrote.)

In the lyrics, Doechii rebukes the online accusations of her being an industry plant, having a drug addiction, or making a deal with the devil. She raps: "All that industry plant shit wack [...] Y'all wanna believe I'm on drugs and forsaken / They won't credit me, so they blame it on Satan / Blame it on my label, blame it on my team / End of the day, everything is on me." She derides the bloggers, streamers, and social media users who peddle the accusations; Martoccio writes that this was likely a pointed response to Ross. Doechii attributes the backlash to misogynoir ("You suck every rap nigga dick from the back / But what's the agenda when the it girl Black?"), using it as an opportunity to tease an upcoming album ("These niggas misogynistic, I'll address it on the album"). She compares the album to a six-month-old baby, which led to speculation that the album would be released in around three months after the single.

Jason P. Frank of Vulture wrote that Doechii also took the opportunity to make the song "both a flex and a therapy session". Doechii flaunts her accomplishments, such as a co-sign from fellow rapper Kendrick Lamar, and adds that her haters dislike her because they refuse to acknowledge the efforts she made to be successful. She adds: "Y'all can’t fathom that I work this hard / And y'all can’t fathom that I earned this chart." In the song's hook, SZA sings words of affirmation: "Fuck a limitation, leave me, girl, get up / Somehow I know that I'll have everything that's mine."

"Girl, Get Up" was written as the last song for Doechii's Swamp Sessions series. In each entry, she challenged herself to write a song within a one-hour time limit.

== Release ==
"Girl, Get Up" was surprise-released on December 29, 2025, by Top Dawg Entertainment and Capitol Records. It was later sent to rhythmic contemporary radio on January 20, 2026.

Shortly after the song's initial release, Ross released a diss track, featuring rapper 6ix9ine, against Doechii. In the diss track, Ross insults Doechii in an assortment of ways and insists that she is still an industry plant.

== Reception ==
Entertainment and cultural critics wrote positively about "Girl, Get Up", citing the sharp and direct way Doechii responded to backlash against her. Frazier Tharpe of GQ praised the lyrics for being incisive and said it renewed his interest in her upcoming album after one of her previous singles, "Anxiety" (2025), dampened it. He also found "Girl, Get Up" well-produced and SZA's feature a welcome addition. Rolling Stone's Jon Blistein expressed similar opinions in his article about the song: "[it] offers Doechii the perfect platform to ruminate on life and retort the hate[;] SZA holds down the song with a simple but infectious hook." Cultural critics who analyzed the anti-Doechii backlash for the Canadian Broadcasting Corporation were supportive of her commentary on misogyny and racism in the song, said that it was representative of hip-hop's long history of misogynoir, and made fun of Ross for being offended or "chipped by a throwaway". (Note: "Chipped by a throwaway" is a reference to a Kendrick Lamar lyric that means that a person is willing to be insulting towards someone else but will get offended when they get insulted in return.) Kylah Williams, who included the song on a best-new-releases list for The Fader, wrote: "Doechii's unbeatable pen and fearless emotional range are what's allowed her to thrive in an industry that's never made it easy for dark-skinned women."

"Girl, Get Up" has won the BET Her Award at BET Awards 2026.

== Commercial performance ==
In the US, "Girl, Get Up" debuted and peaked on number 57 on the Billboard Hot 100, as well as number 12 on Hot R&B/Hip-Hop Songs. The single also peaked at number 13 on Rhythmic Airplay.

Elsewhere, "Girl Get Up" peaked at number 81 in the Canadian Hot 100, 79 in the UK Singles Chart, and 59 in Nigeria's TurnTable Top 100 Songs. It also peaked at number 40 on the UK Hip Hop/R&B chart.

== Music video ==
The music video, directed by James Mackel, was published the same day as the song's initial release. In the video, Doechii dances and drinks champagne on a yacht in her bikini. In another scene, she sits on a stadium rooftop.

== Credits ==
Credits are adapted from Tidal.

- Jaylah Hickmon (Doechii) – vocals, songwriting
- Solána Rowe (SZA) – vocals, songwriting
- Darius Scott (Dixson) – songwriting
- Jahlil Gunter (Jay Versace) – songwriting, production
- Charles Hugo (Chad Hugo) – songwriting
- Gene Thornton (Malice) – songwriting
- Terrence Thornton (Pusha T) – songwriting
- Bryan Williams (Birdman) – songwriting
- Pharrell Williams – songwriting
- Jayda Love – engineering, mixing
- Michael Deano – engineering
- Demitrius Lewis II – additional engineering
- Nicolas De Porcel – mastering

== Charts ==
Chart performance for "Girl, Get Up"
Chart (2026)	Peak position
Australia Hip Hop/R&B (ARIA)	19
Canada Hot 100 (Billboard)	81
Estonia Airplay (TopHit)	98
Germany Airplay (BVMI)	87
New Zealand Hot Singles (RMNZ)	3
Nigeria (TurnTable Top 100)	59
UK Singles (Official Charts)	79
UK Hip Hop/R&B (Official Charts)	40
US Billboard Hot 100	57
US Hot R&B/Hip-Hop Songs (Billboard)	12
US Rhythmic Airplay (Billboard)	13

== Release history ==
Release dates and formats for "Girl, Get Up"
Region	Date	Format(s)	Label(s)	Ref.
Various	December 29, 2025	Digital download; streaming	Top Dawg; Capitol	
United States	January 20, 2026	Rhythmic contemporary radio	Top Dawg; Capitol	
