= SZA =

American singer-songwriter (born 1989)

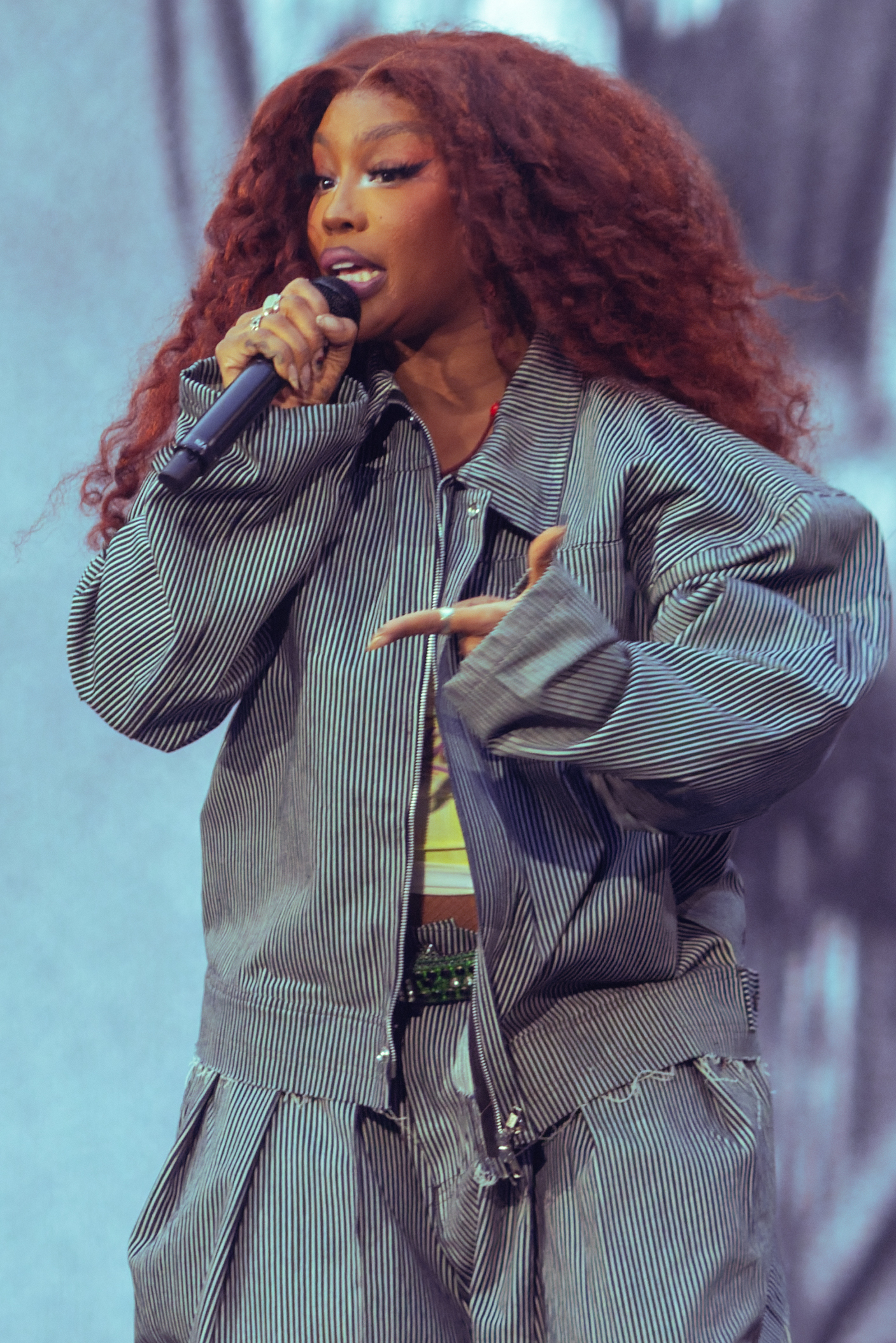
- SZA in 2025
- Born: Solána Imani Rowe; November 8, 1989 (age 37); St. Louis, Missouri, US
- Occupation: Singer-songwriter
- Years active: 2011–present
- Works: Discography; songs
- Awards: Full list
- Musical career
- Origin: Maplewood, New Jersey
- Genres: R&B; hip-hop; pop
- Instrument: Vocals
- Labels: TDE; RCA
- Website: szactrl.com szasos.com
- SZA's voice On the pressure she felt to release SOS as soon as possible Recorded 2022

Solána Imani Rowe (born November 8, 1989), known professionally as SZA (/ˈsɪzə/ SIZ-ə), is an American singer-songwriter. Known for her diaristic songwriting and genre explorations, she is regarded as a prominent figure in influencing contemporary R&B music and popularizing alternative R&B.

After gaining attention online with two self-released extended plays (EP), SZA signed to Top Dawg Entertainment in 2013. Under the label, she released the lo-fi and psychedelic EP Z (2014) and her R&B debut album Ctrl (2017). The latter was critically acclaimed and placed in several year-end lists. Following Ctrl, she engaged in a series of high-profile collaborations over the next four years. These included the top-ten singles "All the Stars" (2018) with Kendrick Lamar, which garnered Academy Award and Golden Globe nominations, and "Kiss Me More" (2021) with Doja Cat, which won SZA her first Grammy Award.

SZA's acclaimed and multi-genre second album SOS (2022) became the first by a woman to spend 100 weeks within the Billboard 200's top ten. The album also broke the record for the longest-running US top-ten by a Black musician. Its fifth single, "Kill Bill", was the third best-selling song of 2023 and peaked atop the Billboard Hot 100. From 2024 to 2025, SZA achieved a string of top-tens with "Saturn" and "30 for 30", both from the deluxe reissue of SOS subtitled Lana (2024), and her longest-running US number-one song, "Luther". Her 2025 Grand National Tour with Lamar is the highest-grossing co-headlining tour in history.

SZA has earned numerous accolades throughout her career, including seven Grammy Awards, a Brit Award, three American Music Awards, a Guild of Music Supervisors Award and two Billboard Women in Music awards, including Woman of the Year. She has co-written songs for artists such as Nicki Minaj, Beyoncé, Travis Scott, Schoolboy Q, and Rihanna. In 2024, she received the Hal David Starlight Award from the Songwriters Hall of Fame.

== Early life and education ==
It's like the belief in one God, all the pillars of Islam et cetera, and I think those are ideas that will never leave me, those make sense in my spirit. It's the way that I connect with God; it has always made sense to me. I think I would love to wear my hijab but I feel like I don't wanna wear my hijab and talk crazy on stage and be in videos with Travis Scott. Like I don't wanna be disrespectful because I have too much love and respect for the religion, for my father, and for myself.

— SZA on her faith

Solána Imani Rowe was born on November 8, 1989, in St. Louis, Missouri. She grew up in Maplewood, New Jersey, with parents who are from the Southern United States. Her mother, Audrey, is a former executive at AT&T, and her father, Abdul, used to be a video producer at CNN. As a child, Rowe was affectionally nicknamed by her mother "Chickabee", derived from the film Nell (1994).

Audrey is Christian, while Abdul is Muslim. Rowe's father would attend her mother's church for special occasions, while her mother would dress up for Jum'ah and accompany her father to the mosque. Rowe attended both Sunday school and Muslim school. In an interview with the blog Muslim Girl, she said that her parents have accepted each other's religions, "their faiths and beliefs [having integrated]".

Rowe wore a hijab during elementary and early middle school. Following the September 11 attacks, in her middle school years, she stopped wearing one for fears of Islamophobic bullying. She later attended Columbia High School, where she participated in the school's gymnastics and cheerleading teams, as well as its dance team dubbed the Special Dance Company. After graduating in 2008, Rowe enrolled in three different colleges before settling at Delaware State University to study marine biology. She dropped out in her final semester to focus on her music career and worked various jobs to support herself.

After dropping out, Rowe often drank Malibu, smoked marijuana, and overslept daily. She lied about her age to get a bartending job and occasionally danced at several strip clubs in New Jersey and New York City. Rowe's stage name, SZA, was inspired by the Five Percent Nation, a Black nationalist religious movement. She took cues from the Supreme Alphabet, taking influence from rappers RZA and GZA of Wu-Tang Clan. The last two letters in her name stand for Zig-Zag and Allah, while the first letter S can mean either savior or sovereign.

== Career ==
=== 2011–2014: Career beginnings and EPs ===
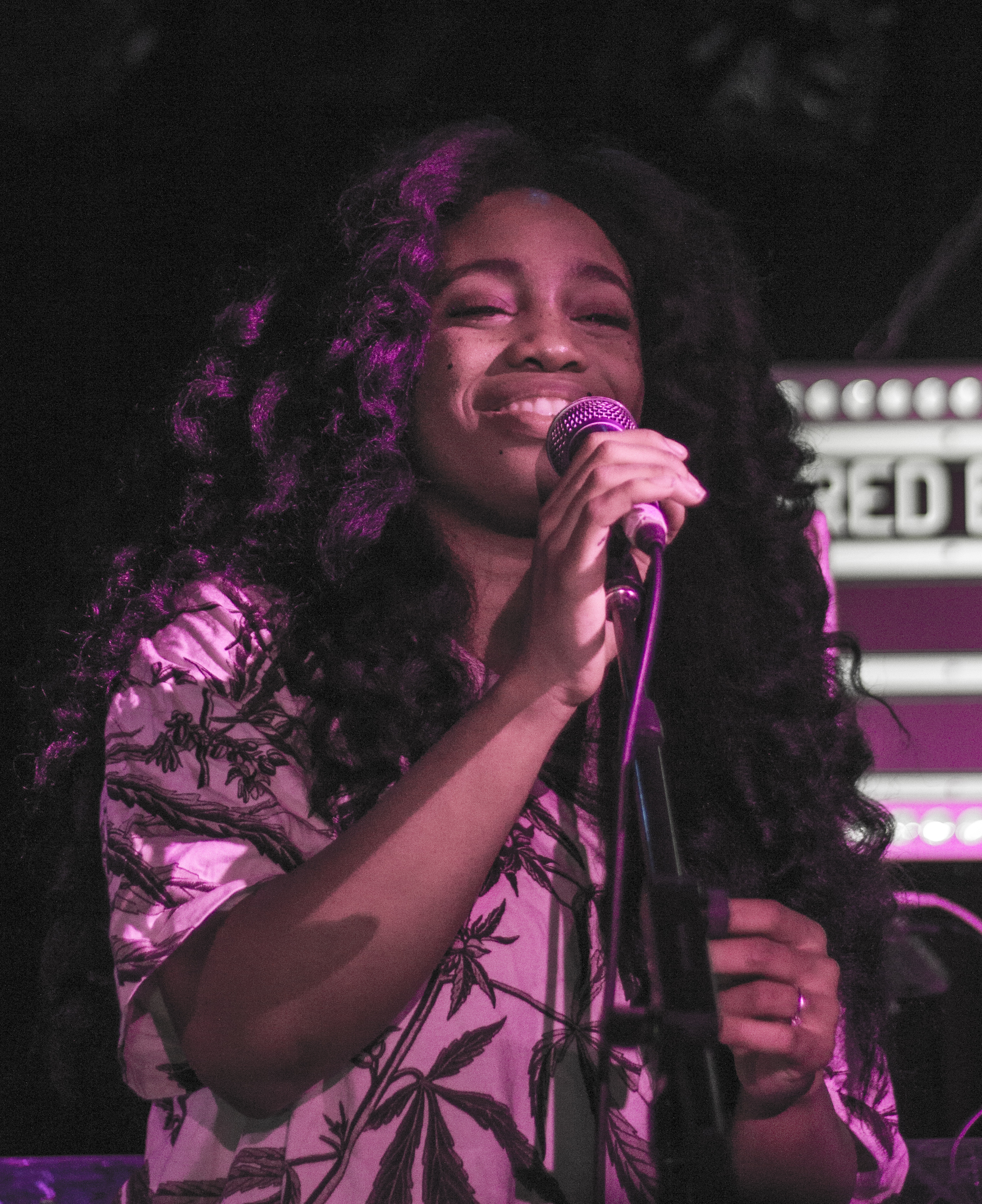
SZA performing in 2013

SZA first met members of Top Dawg Entertainment (TDE) during the CMJ New Music Report in 2011, when her boyfriend's clothing company sponsored a show in which Kendrick Lamar was performing. SZA's early music was shared with TDE president Terrence "Punch" Henderson, who was impressed by the quality of the material. SZA's early music was recorded with friends and neighbors; many of the beats were taken from the Internet. SZA self-released her debut extended play (EP) See.SZA.Run on October 29, 2012. The extended play was met with positive reviews upon release. The Guardian commended the EP, its lyrical content and production, and compared it to the work of musicians like Drake and the Weeknd.

SZA self-released her second EP, S, on April 10, 2013. It was positively received; Consequence of Sound thought that the "dreamy [and] warped [EP] manage[d] to exude confidence and fragility". SZA promoted the extended play with the release of a music video for the EP's lead single, "Ice.Moon". SZA and Punch stayed in contact, and after the former began garnering attention with the release of her two EPs, TDE signed her on July 14, 2013, making her the label's first female artist. In October 2013, SZA joined Swedish band Little Dragon for a four-show tour, beginning on October 17 at the El Rey Theater in Los Angeles and concluding on October 24 at the Music Hall of Williamsburg in Brooklyn. That December, she released the song "Teen Spirit", which was later remixed with a guest verse from rapper 50 Cent. The remix was accompanied by a music video directed by APlusFilmz.

Throughout 2014, SZA was featured on multiple tracks from her labelmates' projects, including two songs on Isaiah Rashad's debut EP, Cilvia Demo, and a collaboration on Schoolboy Q's debut album, Oxymoron. She followed up with the release of her third studio EP, Z, on April 8, led by the single "Babylon" featuring Lamar, which was accompanied by a music video directed by APlusFilmz. To promote the EP, SZA performed at several showcases during the SXSW Music Festival in Austin, Texas. Z marked SZA's chart debut in the UK, reaching number 32 on the R&B chart for the week ending April 19. In the US, the EP debuted at number 39 on the Billboard 200; it sold 6,980 copies in its first week and peaked at number nine on Top R&B/Hip-Hop Albums. Z acquired a small cult following online, gaining popularity within niche communities on Tumblr which contributed to her slow rise in popularity. By the end of the year, SZA opened for Jhené Aiko's Enter the Void Tour and Coldplay's Ghost Stories Tour.

During 2014, SZA befriended record producer ThankGod4Cody during a time when he was working on music for Rashad. One time, she overheard him making a beat from the next room, and they decided to build a song out of it. It eventually became the standalone single "Sobriety". She released it via SoundCloud in November, with the genre tag "Not R&B". In 2015, she met another record producer, Carter Lang, via a chance encounter at a studio; they and ThankGod4Cody began a work relationship the same year, collaborating on an upcoming project by SZA. Initially given the title A, the project was going to be the final EP of the "SZA" trilogy that started with S. Work on it started back in 2014. As time passed, A slowly developed into SZA's debut album Ctrl.

=== 2015–2018: Ctrl and breakthrough ===
A's release date was initially scheduled for late 2015. However, due to disputes with TDE and persistent feelings of anxiety fueled by her perfectionism, SZA had to rework the project multiple times. The label then postponed its release from 2015 to the start of 2016. In a February post on Instagram, TDE implied A was in its final stage of creation and would be released the same year. One of its prospective songs, "TwoAM", was surprise-released through their SoundCloud account in May; it was eventually scrapped from the tracklist. Later that same month, SZA told Entertainment Weekly that A was now growing into a full-length album. A mid-2016 release date was planned for the project, only for it to be delayed again to November 8. With frustrations mounting due to TDE's postponements, SZA angrily announced on Twitter that she wanted to quit music. She later retracted her statement.

While working on A, SZA was co-writing songs for other singers. She co-wrote "Feeling Myself" by Nicki Minaj and Beyoncé in 2014, Scott's "Ok Alright" in 2015, and Rihanna's "Consideration" in 2016. "Consideration" was going to be on A as a track called "LouAnne Johnson"; SZA deemed it the album's "centerpiece" and even had a music video filmed. Much to her disappointment, TDE had other plans, handing the song to Rihanna for her album Anti and making SZA a feature instead. Regardless, "Consideration" contributed to SZA's breakthrough, and she grew to appreciate the label's decision. Apart from Rihanna, SZA's other collaborators from 2014 to 2016 included her several labelmates like Lamar, Rashad, Ab-Soul, and Schoolboy Q.

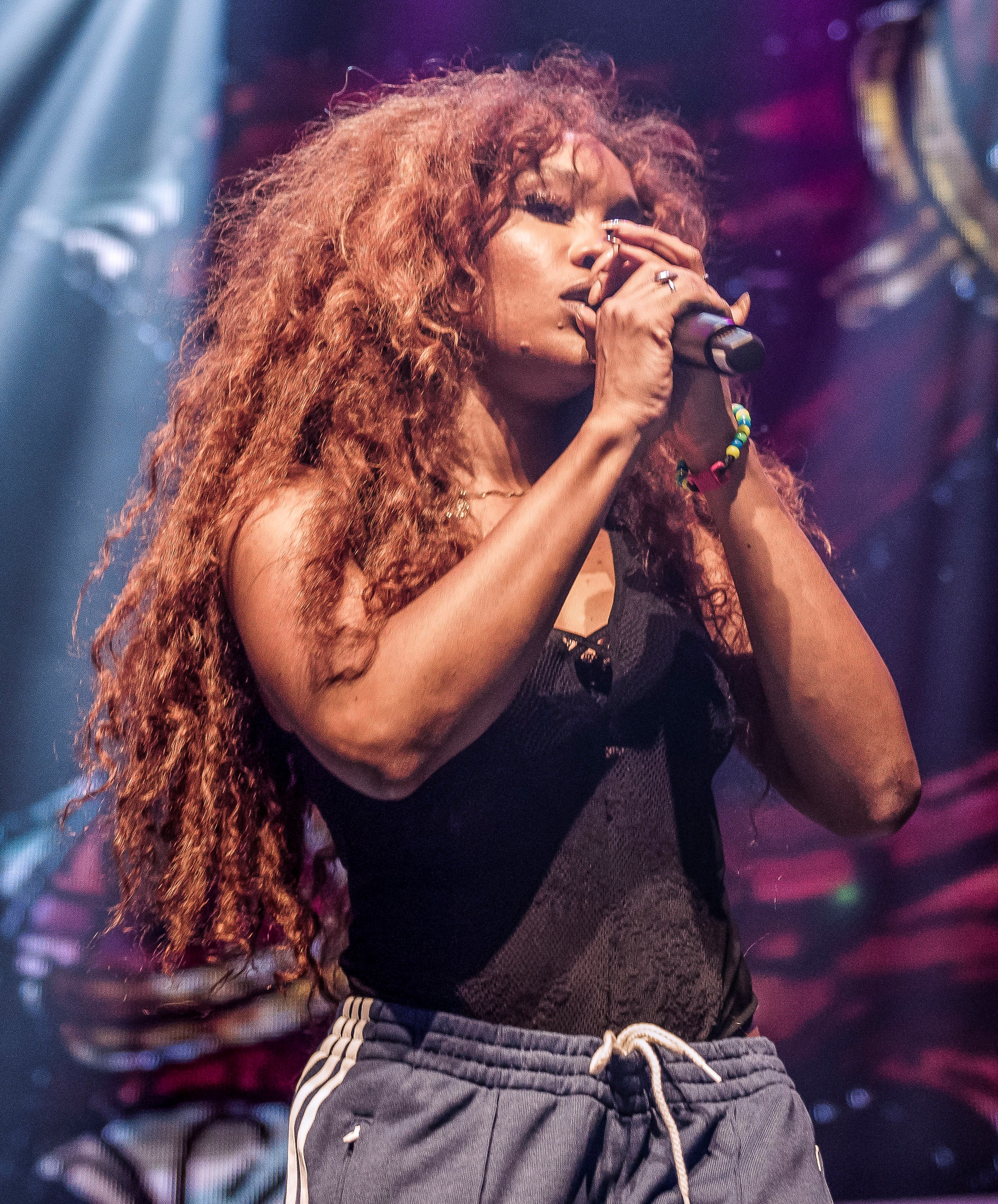
SZA performing in Toronto on the Ctrl The Tour in August 2017

In April 2017, SZA signed with the label RCA Records; earlier that year, in January, she had announced that the title of A had been replaced with Ctrl. The album was finally released as scheduled on June 9, following a May 25 teaser video that featured a voiceover from RZA. In Ctrl, SZA continued to lean into her established alternative R&B sound, incorporating hints of alternative rock as well. Meanwhile, critics mainly categorized it under contemporary R&B. To promote the album, SZA released five singles: "Drew Barrymore", "Love Galore" featuring Scott, "The Weekend", "Broken Clocks", and "Garden (Say It like Dat)". She also embarked on the international Ctrl the Tour, which ran from 2017 to 2018.

Ctrl was universally acclaimed upon its release. Several publications included it on their 2017 year-end lists; the album topped Time's ranking and placed at number two on Billboard's, Pitchfork's, and NPR's. In the US, Ctrl debuted at number three on the Billboard 200, sold 60,000 first-week units, and became the second longest-charting R&B album by a woman. Its run has lasted for over eight consecutive years. Furthermore, "The Weekend" and "Love Galore" peaked within the top 40 of the Billboard Hot 100. In 2018, SZA received her first five Grammy nominations due to her work on Ctrl, including Best New Artist. Although she was the most-nominated woman for that year, she did not win in any category.

After Ctrl, SZA went on a series of song collaborations, two of which were her first Hot 100 top-tens. The first, "What Lovers Do" (2017) by Maroon 5, peaked at number nine; the second, "All the Stars" (2018) with Lamar, reached number seven. The latter was also her first top-ten in the UK, where it peaked at number five. "All the Stars" was released as the lead single from the soundtrack album of Black Panther. With it, SZA received her first film award nominations, like an Academy Award for Best Original Song, a Critics' Choice Award for Best Song, and a Golden Globe Award for Best Original Song. At the 2018 MTV Video Music Awards, "All the Stars" won Best Visual Effects. Elsewhere, SZA contributed to the second soundtrack for the television series Insecure with "Quicksand"; featured on the remix of Lorde's "Homemade Dynamite" from Melodrama (2017); and appeared on Cardi B's "I Do" from Invasion of Privacy (2018).

=== 2019–2023: Collaborations and SOS ===
SZA took five years to release her second album, SOS (2022). She became increasingly burned out the longer she worked on it. SZA was frequently unsatisfied and bored with the music she was writing, and she was worried about making sure her creative decisions for the album made sense. She considered quitting music again if critical reception of SOS were overwhelmingly negative. Allegations of further label tensions rose when she tweeted and deleted, "At this point y'all gotta ask Punch", in 2020. In a follow-up tweet, she mentioned that all he ever told her about releasing new music was "soon". This revealed that her relationship with her label had been hostile since the delays of her second album, which was last announced back in an interview in 2019.

SZA continued her string of collaborations while she was working on SOS and hinting at its release. Her single with American rapper Doja Cat – "Kiss Me More" – was one of the most successful songs of 2021. It gave SZA her first Grammy Award: one for Best Pop Duo/Group Performance. SZA had been releasing more singles as a lead artist as well, teasing new songs at the outro of their music videos to raise anticipation for SOS. Many of the songs went viral on the social media application TikTok, which TDE leveraged for the album's promotional strategy. This series of singles began with the standalone "Hit Different" in September 2020, followed by the SOS lead single "Good Days" in December. "Good Days" peaked at number nine on the Hot 100, her first solo top-10 in the US. The second and third SOS singles, "I Hate U" (2021) and "Shirt" (2022), peaked at numbers 7 and 11. Their official releases happened after SZA shared their demo versions online and they went viral on TikTok. "I Hate U" was originally a SoundCloud-exclusive, uploaded alongside "Nightbird" and "Joni" at the advice of SZA's astrologer. Before becoming a single, "Shirt" was teased via snippets since late 2020.

In 2022, SZA released a deluxe edition of Ctrl to celebrate its five-year anniversary. The deluxe version consisted of seven scrapped outtakes, including "TwoAM" (now spelled "2AM"). Later in November, SZA posted the teaser for SOS on social media. The video, soundtracked to her then-unreleased "PSA", hinted at the album's title by playing its corresponding Morse code. The standard version of SOS was released on December 9 to widespread acclaim. Critics agreed that it surpassed expectations that arose from the years-long wait. SOS was a multi-genre work; it was a product of SZA's desire to prove her versatility, after the media had consistently called her an R&B artist. With the album, SZA combined R&B with a variety of genres like rap, rock, and pop.

SOS was a huge commercial success. It spent over ten weeks atop the Billboard 200, was the second most-streamed album of 2023 globally, and set a diverse array of chart records. The album surpassed Adele's 21 and Michael Jackson's Thriller as the longest-running US top-10 by, respectively, a woman and a Black artist. Following its release, SOS spawned three more singles: "Nobody Gets Me", "Kill Bill", and "Snooze". "Kill Bill" topped the Billboard Hot 100 and was the third best-selling single of 2023, accruing 1.84 billion units worldwide based on streams and digital sales. At the 2024 Grammy Awards, where SZA was the most-nominated artist, SOS and "Snooze" won Best Progressive R&B Album and Best R&B Song, respectively. From 2023 to 2024, SZA embarked on the SOS Tour to promote the album.

In September 2023, SZA performed at an invite-only show in Brooklyn Navy Yard to celebrate the success of SOS. Included in the set were "PSA" alongside three other unreleased songs: "Saturn", "Diamond Boy (DTM)", and "BMF". SZA told the crowd that the deluxe edition of SOS, titled Lana, would be "coming soon". That same month, she featured on Drake's "Slime You Out", which became her second US Billboard Hot 100 number-one. In November, she stated to Variety that Lana was not a conventional deluxe edition, but virtually a new album with a tracklist that was continuously expanding. Many of the songs were newly recorded pieces of music; others were outtakes from SOS.

=== 2024–25: Lana and the Grand National Tour ===
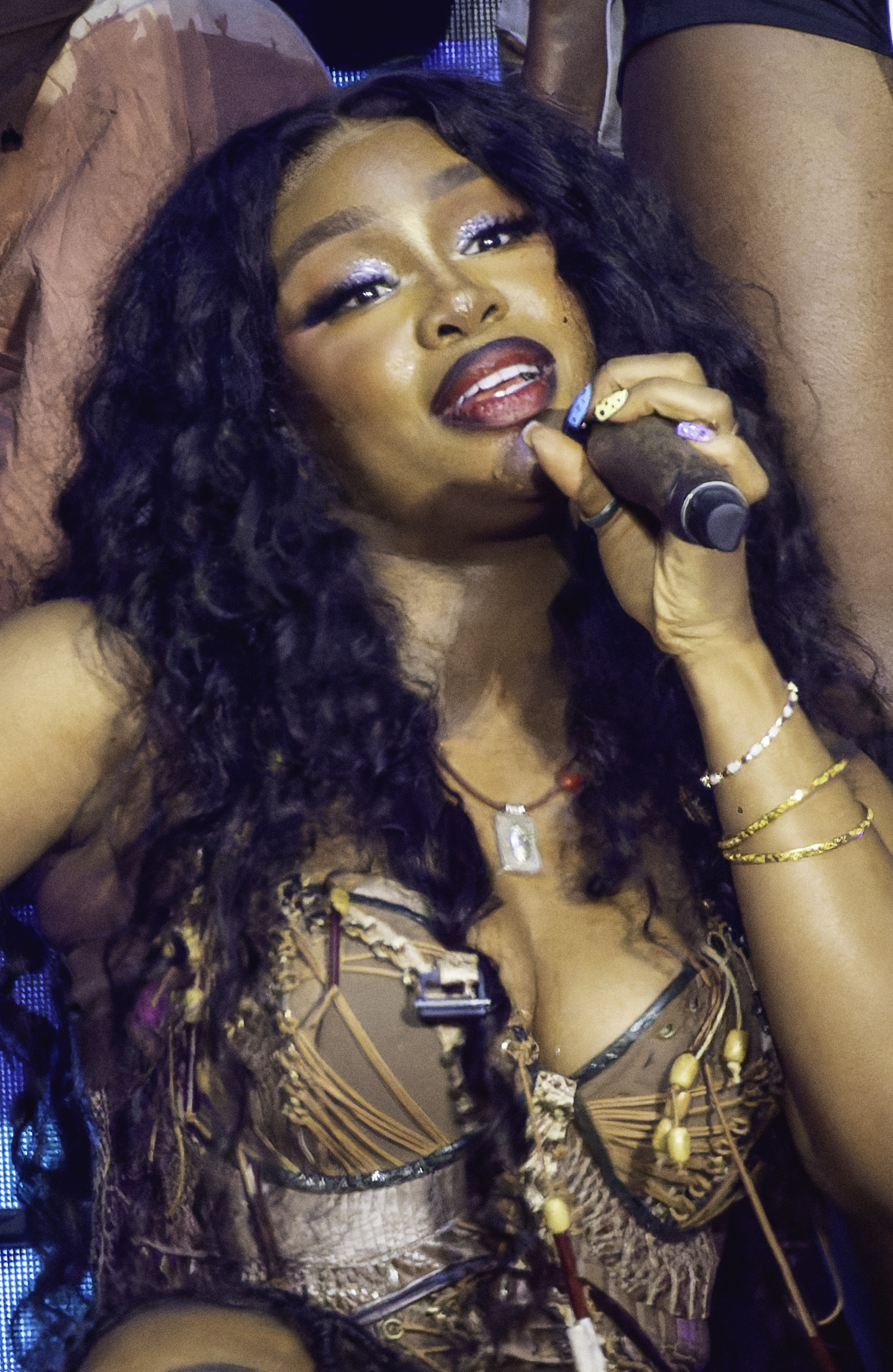
SZA at the Glastonbury Festival 2024

Variety and Time magazines listed Lana as one of the most anticipated albums of 2024. SZA announced in November via a livestream by Twitch entertainer Kai Cenat that the album would be out by the end of the year. It was released on December 20, 2024, and rereleased with four more tracks on February 9 of the following year. The standard edition of Lana was preceded by the lead single "Saturn", which she debuted at the 2024 Grammy Awards and which won Best R&B Song at the next ceremony. It peaked at number six on the Hot 100, her tenth top-10 on the chart. Two more songs she performed at Brooklyn Navy Yard – "Diamond Boy (DTM)" and "BMF" – were also included on Lana. The latter was released as a single from the reissue in 2025, alongside a collaboration with Lamar titled "30 for 30". The reissue's updated version featured "PSA" and "Joni", the latter of which had leaked back in 2023. After the rerelease, SOS returned to the top of the Billboard 200 for its eleventh and twelfth weeks at number one. Its last week at number one was in early 2023, making SOS the album with the longest time between weeks atop the chart. In August, the album reached its 100th week in the Billboard 200 top 10, the first by a woman to do so.

In November 2024, Lamar, who had left TDE back in 2022, released his sixth studio album GNX. SZA appeared on two songs, the third track "Luther" and the closing track "Gloria". In support of GNX and Lana, the duo embarked on the Grand National Tour which started in April 2025, breaking the record for the highest-grossing co-headlining tour. SOS topped the Billboard 200 a week after the first show, which marked the album's thirteenth week at number one. Prior to the Grand National Tour, SZA appeared alongside Lamar in his performance for the Super Bowl LIX halftime show, duetting some of their collaborations. Following this, "30 for 30" reached a new peak of number 10 on the Hot 100, despite not being part of the set list. The week after, "Luther" began a consecutive 13-week run atop the Hot 100 and became SZA's longest-running number-one in the US.

=== 2025–present: Upcoming third studio album, business ventures, and film projects ===
Outside music, SZA ventured into other creative projects in 2025, beginning work on cosmetic and fashion products. During the Grand National Tour, she launched Not Beauty, a line of lip products available exclusively in pop-up stores at concert venues. She was also announced as the first artistic director of shoe company Vans, working with them on exclusive fashion collections. In television and film, SZA appeared as a guest in the 55th season of Sesame Street and co-starred alongside Keke Palmer in the buddy comedy film One of Them Days (2025). Several critics praised the synergy between the pair, and 93% of the 106 reviews from critics from Rotten Tomatoes gave the film a positive review. SZA wrote a song for the soundtrack of Pixar's Hoppers (2026), entitled "Save the Day", and is expected to star in CoComelon: The Movie in 2027. That same year, SZA will headline Coachella alongside Dua Lipa and Tame Impala.

Starting in the latter half of 2025, SZA posted a series of snippets previewing new music via an alternate Instagram account. Some of the snippets she teased would presumably appear on her third album. These include an R&B song with an airy soundscape, titled by fans as "Let You Know"; and a song that samples "Hush" by Natanya, titled by fans as "Am I a Bitch?". SZA told GQ the titles of three other tracks – "Passenger Princess", "Burgers", and "Yearner" – in an interview with the magazine during November. In the meantime, SZA appeared on the songs "IRL" by Lizzo, "Take Me Dancing" by Doja Cat, "PT Cruiser" by Moruf, "Girl, Get Up" by Doechii, "Boy in Red" by Isaiah Rashad, "Is It Cool?" by Steve Lacy, and "See You in My Dreams" by Victoria Monét.

== Artistry ==
=== Influences ===
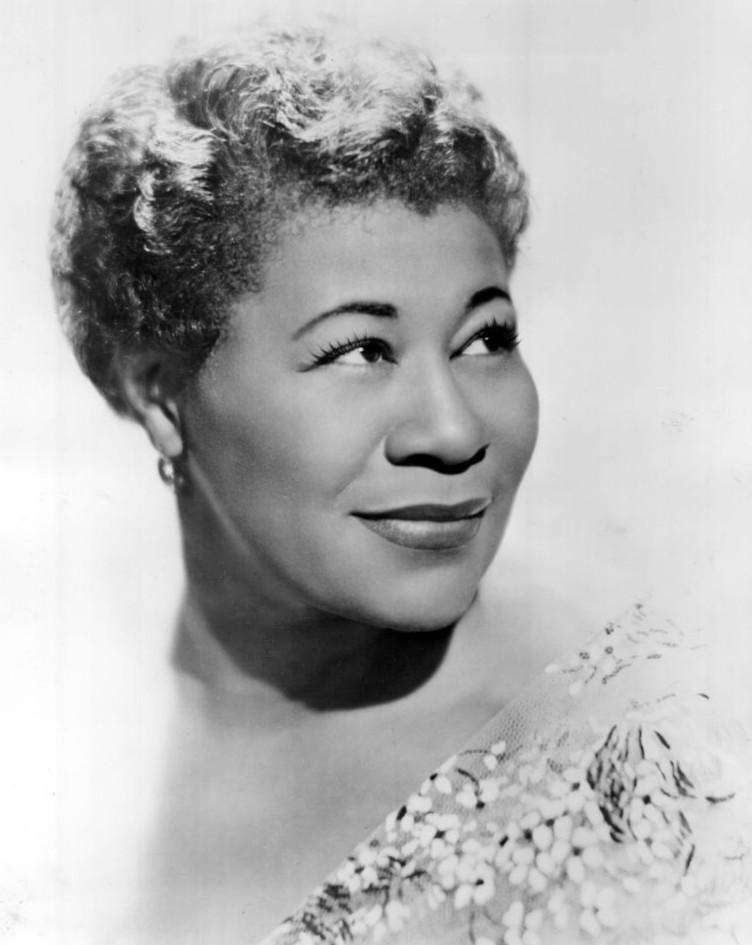
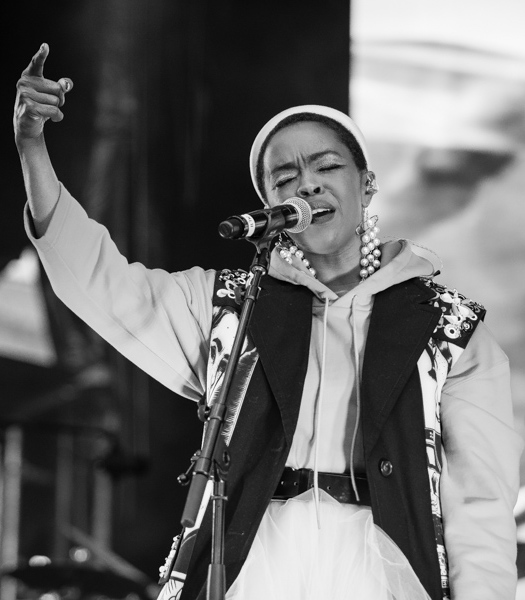
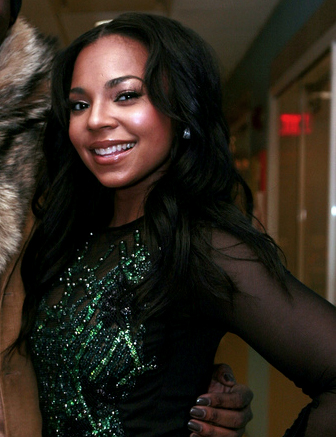
SZA has cited musical artists such as Ella Fitzgerald, Lauryn Hill and Ashanti as influences.

Growing up, SZA was exposed by her family to artists from different genres, which were formative influences for her music. Her mother enjoyed R&B and church music, her father was a fan of jazz and funk musicians like Miles Davis, Billie Holiday, and John Coltrane, and her sister listened to melodic rap and hip-hop artists like Tupac Shakur. SZA listens to Ella Fitzgerald for vocal influence and has said that Lauryn Hill is one of her personal influences. SZA has expressed admiration for singer Ashanti, citing her as a major inspiration and someone she has loved since childhood.

SZA also cites Meelah, the Red Hot Chili Peppers, LFO, Macy Gray, Common, Björk, Jamiroquai, and "a lot of Wu, Nas, Mos Def, Hov" as inspirations. Speaking on her influences, SZA said: "[My] personal influences came from dancing with American Ballet Theatre and doing pieces to Björk [music]. That's the only time I had really any outside influence to music. So, the people that I fell in love with on a musical level were always much older. Jamiroquai is just, like, the shit for me." In an interview for Live Nation Entertainment, SZA described the meeting she had with Beyoncé for the writing of "Feeling Myself", affirming "Beyoncé might be the most perfect, beautiful being I've ever met in my whole life. She's the most inspirational woman on earth, next to my mother". SZA also expressed admiration for Rihanna, praising her strong and confident attitude and her commitment to creating only the music she truly wants to make.

SZA is known for referencing films and television series across her discography. She has named multiple songs after actresses or the characters they play. "Drew Barrymore" was named after and inspired by the actress, "Jodie" was named after Jodie Foster, (Note: "Jodie" is a song from Ctrl's deluxe edition, produced by rapper Tyler, the Creator. It leaked sometime around 2021, and SZA referred to it as "Jodie Foster" then.) and "Go Gina" is a reference to Tisha Campbell's role of Gina on the sitcom Martin (1992–1997). Throughout SOS, SZA incorporates numerous film references in both song titles and lyrics: she named "Kill Bill" after the 2003–2004 film duology; in "Blind", she references Julia Stiles in Save the Last Dance (2001); in the song "Used", SZA makes a reference to Obi-Wan, the Jedi Master from Star Wars; and "Smoking on My Ex Pack" contains a comparison between SZA's former romantic partners and Sideshow Bob, a character from The Simpsons who is both a clown and a criminal. "Scorsese Baby Daddy", from Lana, is a reference to filmmaker and director Martin Scorsese.

=== Music ===
"Drew Barrymore" (2017)
SZA self-identifies with the label "alternative", and she has resisted being categorized solely as R&B throughout her career. One song that demonstrates her style of alternative music is her 2017 single "Drew Barrymore".

"30 for 30" (2025)
Throughout her career, SZA has experimented with various genres, like hip-hop, in tandem with R&B. In the single "30 for 30", SZA combines her usual R&B singing style with a rap flow, often referred to as rap-singing.

==== Genre ====
Critics have frequently described SZA as an R&B and hip-hop singer-songwriter, a narrative for which she has expressed disdain since the beginning of her career. In 2014, when she uploaded the single "Teen Spirit" on SoundCloud, she tagged the song with the categories "Glitter Trap" and "Not R&B". SZA's earliest songs are built around dreamlike, psychedelic, and lo-fi instrumentals; she describes them as "hood, with feminine inflections."

SZA identifies with the label "alternative". Many of her songs from Ctrl have influences of alternative rock, whereas one track from SOS, "F2F", is explicitly pop rock. In her view, her being described as a contemporary R&B artist in the media is restrictive and racially prejudiced. She considers it a byproduct of the racist segregation of Black artists from White artists during the 20th century, which industry professionals did by relegating Black people to R&B categories. Saying that Black music has never been limited to the genre, SZA told Consequence: "We started rock 'n' roll. Why can't we just be expansive and not reductive?"

Outside of R&B, critics have also written that several of her works combine the genre with hip-hop or pop music. She often uses the stylistic technique of rap-singing in her music. SOS producer Jay Versace stated that songs like "Smoking on My Ex Pack" were inspired by rap songs that he heard growing up, adding "I wanted to hear her either singing or rapping on. That was specifically for her."

Regardless, SZA has expressed confusion about the media's attempts to categorize her. She prefers to be seen as simply someone who makes music and nothing more, saying, "when you try to label it, you remove the option for it to be limitless. It diminishes the music." "Genre agnosticism" was how Michael Madden of Consequence described SZA's musical style.

==== Voice ====
According to Rolling Stone's Marissa G. Muller, SZA's voice alternates between a "vapory husk and a sky-high falsetto". Jordan Sargent, in a Pitchfork review of Z, describes her vocals as "chillwave" and "ethereal". Her vocal style has been described as taking on the "lilt" of a jazz singer.

SZA has a slight speech impediment, which influences her delivery. Her fans treat it as a running joke, saying that she sings in "cursive and italics". However, journalist Mankaprr Conteh argues that SZA's enunciation began to be clearer with SOS. Conteh adds that nevertheless, "her words retain the swirls and curves that can make them run together and occasionally become alluringly hard to decipher."

=== Songwriting ===
==== Writing process ====
When I'm in the studio, it hurts too much sometimes [...] It's easier to be me through [other artists'] eyes than it is to sit with some of the really harsh things that I say about myself to myself.

— SZA while interviewing Kendrick Lamar for Harper's Bazaar, 2024

SZA sees songwriting as a way of proving her self-worth. She personally considers her songwriting awards as her most important achievements, having started her career without anyone to write for her. An enjoyer of poetry, SZA began writing songs due to her passion about the hobby.

SZA also thinks of songwriting as a form of self-therapy, using it to record and resolve her struggles. However, when she tries to draw from her experiences and emotions, the weight of the pain can be too much to bear. She sometimes writes from the perspective of other people; due to her tendency to self-deprecate, SZA sees the writing technique as a way to "say nicer things about [herself]". For example, "Joni" (2025) – a song about being resilient and achieving perfection amid the difficulties of life – was written from the perspective of Canadian musician Joni Mitchell. SZA's other muses include singer-songwriter Frank Ocean and rapper Future.

Several of SZA's works are the result of improvisation. Because she writes to express whatever comes to her mind, she tends to freestyle and produce stream-of-consciousness songs. In an interview for Variety, she recounts that she "never [has] topics" before starting a track. Her freestyles are part of what SZA calls "palate cleanser" moments during recording. In them, she would quickly write songs in between her more serious projects, as a way to refresh her mind. Some of her biggest songs, like "Kill Bill", were improvised. For this reason, she hates the majority of her commercially successful tracks: "I knew it would be something that pissed me off. It's always a song that I don't give a f–k about that's just super easy, not the sh-t that I put so much heart and energy into."

==== Analyses ====
SZA's writing style, as noted by Mesfin Fekadu in a review for The Hollywood Reporter, often takes a vulnerable, confessional, and reflective tone. She explores many common fears among adolescents and young adults, such as living up to beauty standards or grappling with being in one's 20s. Much of her music is about heartbreak, nostalgia, abandonment, and self-worth. Sydney Gore of Alternative Press writes that "whereas hypersexuality gives some people the ick, SZA's unfiltered canon of raw feelings seemingly makes others squirm because the level of vulnerability she exudes is too painfully real." SZA once explained that her feeling excluded in school as a child motivated her to prioritize creating an inclusive environment for both herself and her fans. As her career evolved past Ctrl, her writing had become more aggressive, unafraid to show her competitiveness and "not a nice girl" attitude.

Several critics have noted that SZA has cultivated a "girl next door" persona through her music, and she has been dubbed the girl next door of R&B. Many have also spoken about her songwriting's relatability—mainly due to its exploration of insecurity—to other Black women. Billboard journalists wrote that her style of self-deprecation was effective in gaining a devoted audience of "awkward" and anxious Black girls, reflecting the distinct shame they experience in their dating life due to misogynoir. Elle journalist DeAsia Paige argues that SZA encourages such girls to embrace their insecurities—and defy expectations of being independent women—"in a world that relentlessly picks them apart" as a result of their race. When SZA spoke about how Barrymore inspired the eponymous song, she said that she grew up not seeing herself represented enough in media like television series.

=== Collaborations and features ===
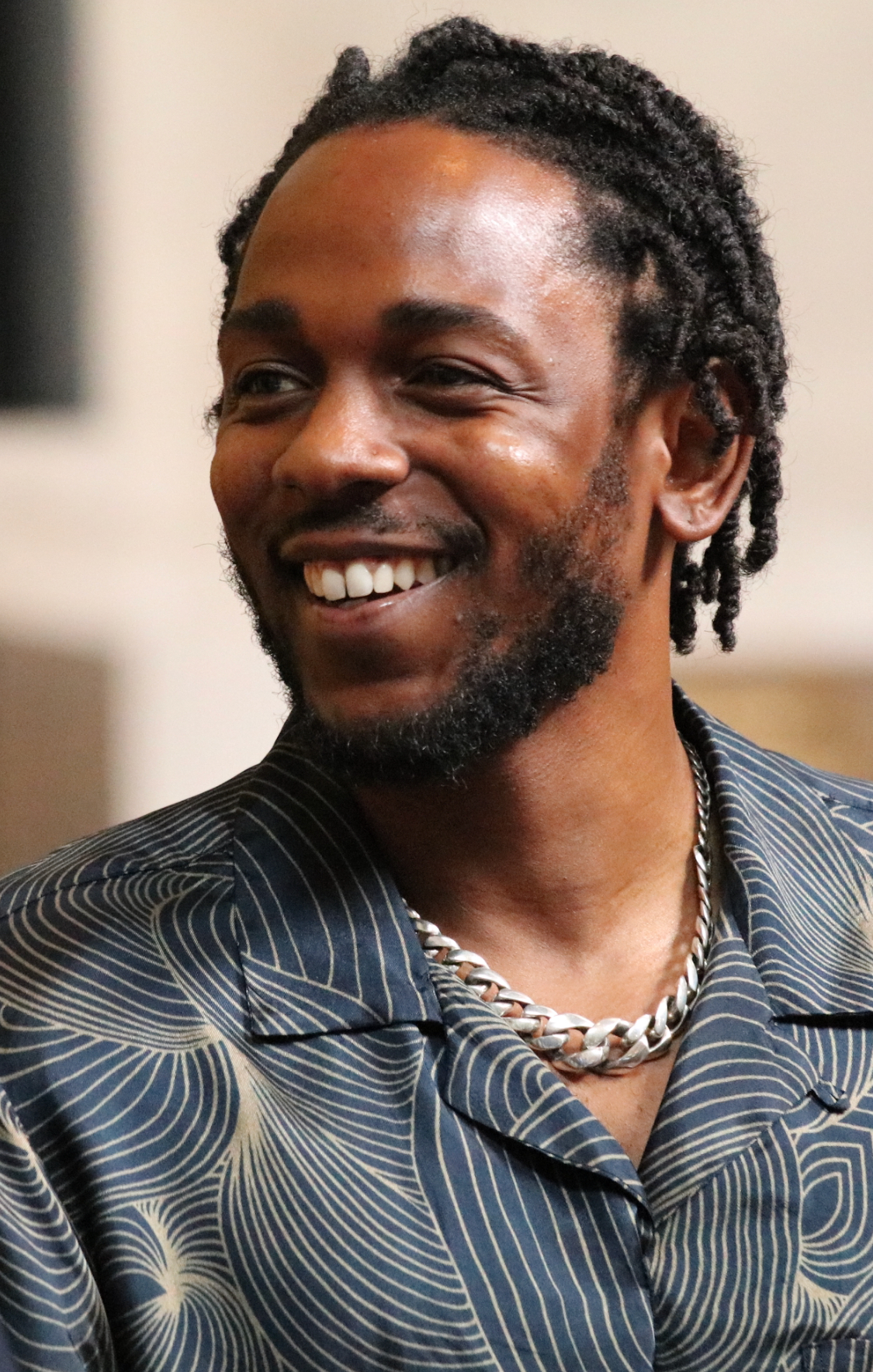
SZA has worked with Kendrick Lamar, her most well-known collaborator, on several songs since 2014.

SZA is known for her work relationship with former TDE labelmate Kendrick Lamar. Heran Mamo of Billboard writes that they are the "ultimate rapper-singer duo", and HipHopDX's Andy Bustard comments that they are the best such duo of their time. Dubbed by SZA as her "sensei", Lamar has inspired her to take risks and experiment when making music. In a talk show interview, she commented: "He's a huge part of my fumbling and finding era because I'm trusting his expertise ... So I'm just like, 'Teach me, sensei, what you know.'" The two released their first song together in 2014, which was "Babylon" from SZA's third EP Z. He and SZA have three top-ten singles: "All the Stars" in 2018, the US number one "Luther" in 2024, and "30 for 30" in 2025.

Many other artists have worked with SZA multiple times. One of her earliest collaborators was rapper Mac Miller, who produced two songs from Z. She first met him when she moved to Los Angeles in 2014. SZA and singer and rapper Lizzo, whom she befriended after a 2013 Red Bull tour, once considered starting a rock band. The two co-wrote "F2F" from SOS when the idea first came to them. SZA has featured on two of Lizzo's songs, "Special" (2023) and "IRL" (2025), and Lizzo was originally going to be a feature on "BMF". (Note: "BMF" was formerly known as "Boy from South Detroit", and initial reports about Lizzo's appearance used that title.) Apart from singers and rappers, there are select producers with whom SZA often works. Two of them, Carter Lang and ThankGod4Cody, have produced several of her songs from Ctrl, SOS, and Lana.

Norma Halmon, SZA's deceased maternal grandmother, appears via sampled voice recordings on Ctrl and SOS. Rowe affectionally calls her "Granny", and she is credited as such on both albums. Writing for Vulture, journalist Zach Schonfeld ranked Halmon as the fourth-best mother to appear on their child or grandchild's songs. He gave her a "wholesome index" of eight out of ten.

=== Fashion ===
During an interview, SZA said she is less inspired by strictly music, and more inspired by creating art in general; she has looked up to people who were not "typical artists" including her "favorite gymnast, ice-skater, saxophonist, painter, or movie director", continuing to say she was particularly inspired by film director Spike Lee. During an interview with W, SZA spoke on her style influences, saying a large amount of her style inspiration comes from movies, including Wes Anderson films, praising his use of "pantone color palette" and that she "would love to dress like a character from Moonrise Kingdom. Or perhaps Bill Murray in The Life Aquatic." Along with her music, SZA's image has been compared to neo-soul artists Lauryn Hill and Erykah Badu. SZA's hair became a point of interest during the early stages of her career and she discussed it in interviews with Vogue and Harper's Bazaar. During her performances, SZA tends to wear "free-flowing" clothes that are easy to move around in and wears pajamas or baggy clothing onstage.

== Reception and legacy ==
Several critics and musicians credit SZA with significantly influencing the state of contemporary R&B. Some wrote that she was instrumental in bringing the genre, which had peaked in the late 20th century and declined with the rise of hip-hop, into the mainstream again. According to the Recording Academy's Princess Gabbara, SZA's success helped to "[flip] R&B on its head and [shatter] the tired trope that '[the genre] is dead.'" BET's Khalilah Archie wrote that SZA embodied an important shift for the genre – making vulnerable lyrics a more prominent staple of R&B music. Many of her contemporaries like Summer Walker, Tink, and Ari Lennox have been influenced by her songwriting; Baby Rose described her as "a radical light". Critics also cite SZA as a prominent figure in the rise of alternative R&B music.

In 2023, NME called SZA one of the most influential voices in contemporary music. She wrote that few artists have shaped the sound of modern R&B as much as her. Vogue Australia said that "it's hard to imagine what an R&B playlist would sound like without her now". SZA's debut album has been credited in numerous retrospectives as not only propelling her to mainstream success, but also shaping the sound of R&B. Williams highlighted the album's lasting influence, noting that even six years after its release, its impact continues to shape a "new generation of young, bright artists". The Australian Broadcasting Corporation's Al Newstead thought that the album redefined genre boundaries through combining classic R&B and neo soul traditions with modern sounds.

In 2025, Billboard ranked SZA as the 44th-greatest R&B musician of all time. Staff writer Heran Mamo wrote that SZA was proof that "artists with an R&B foundation [...] can successfully break through the genre's borders and ascend into pop's upper echelon". In an unrelated article, Mamo compared the trajectory of her career to that of Beyoncé, who debuted as an R&B artist and found crossover success as she expanded her sound. Rolling Stone, meanwhile, put SZA at number 180 on their 2023 list of the 200 greatest singers. The magazine also ranked Ctrl and SOS at numbers 472 and 351, respectively, on their 2023 list of the 500 greatest albums of all time.

== Public image and views ==
=== Social media use ===
SZA has a strong online presence. Early in her career, she was very active on the social media site Tumblr, where many people discovered her EPs and contributed to her rise to fame. SZA described Tumblr as "her shit" and "such a crazy place" when she was still scouring the website. She also uses Twitter frequently to express her thoughts, share updates on music and projects, and to talk to fans. On Instagram, SZA posts Reels and Stories and releases teasers or snippets of upcoming works, and has frequently been seen commenting on various Reels. Her songs often go viral on TikTok, which she uses to her advantage when promoting music.

=== Music leaks ===
Many of SZA's unreleased songs have been leaked online, which she has openly criticized, stating, "When people leak my songs, they ruin them". She feels that when a song is leaked, it no longer belongs to her but to the public, describing it as "something unfinished that you decided was ready to be shared". In December 2018, SZA faced her first major leak when a nine-track unreleased album titled Comethru was distributed through a label called Scissor. On the album, SZA was credited as "Sister Solana", while Lamar made a guest appearance under the name "King Kenny". In January 2024, SZA warned that she may pursue legal action against those who release her music without permission, stating that she promised to hold them accountable as much as the law allows. In March 2024, SZA addressed a fan on Twitter who leaked unreleased images and audio, and later deleted and deactivated her accounts before RCA could take action. Punch noted that leaks frequently result in project delays or complete cancellations.

=== Generative artificial intelligence ===
SZA has publicly spoken against generative artificial intelligence (AI), citing environmental, artistic, and racial justice concerns. She is critical of AI music generators, such as Suno, as well as recording artists that allegedly use and invest on these services. She says that these softwares are trained heavily on Black songwriters and producers, posing commercial and creative threats to those like her, and has urged them to denounce such services. She posted on Twitter in 2026, "[w]e make up 13% of the American population yet influence the world [with] our sound and perspective [...] We have no protection in legislature[,] medical or creative. The easiest to steal from [...] Fuck these weird-ass vultures." SZA, who advocates against environmental racism, has also said that the pollution caused by AI data centers disproportionally affects Black and Brown communities. Furthermore, she has expressed her worries about generative AI via her songs; in "Ghost in the Machine" (2022), she sings about her fears about the rise of AI within the music industry and worries that it could take over her job. Her creative process when making her upcoming third studio album was partly to show how AI songs and singers could never replicate human creativity. She told i-D magazine: "[I want to provide] the type of blend of information my human experience provides [that] AI can't even be prompted to fuck with."

=== Philanthropy and activism ===
Part of SZA's philanthropy is advocating for environmental justice and spreading awareness about the climate crisis. Following Hurricane Harvey in 2017, SZA invited fans to spend time with her after Ctrl the Tour in exchange for donating essential items such as non-perishable food, diapers, gloves, masks, trash bags, and baby food. In 2019, a fan of SZA diagnosed with lupus, sickle cell disease, and Crohn's disease shared on social media that she had contributed financially toward her chemotherapy treatments and used her platform to help find a kidney donor. That same year, SZA launched a merchandise line called Ctrl Fishing Company, which included apparel featuring phrases such as "Puck Flastic" and "Sustainability Gang", as well as sea animals like blue whales and seahorses.

SZA has also advocated for social justice. In 2021, she partnered with American Forests and tea brand Tazo to address environmental racism. The corps comprised 25 locally hired fellows trained in climate justice advocacy, tree planting, and maintenance. SZA has voiced criticism for 45th and 47th president Donald Trump; during the 2016 presidential election, she criticized his supporters for endorsing "bigotry, lying, and xenophobia", adding that "[people were] dying from the stereotypes he perpetuates". In 2024, during an Auckland show for the SOS Tour, SZA expressed her support for Palestinian rights by waving their flag as she performed and saying "Free Palestine".

== Personal life ==
SZA has been open about her mental health issues; she is diagnosed with autism and attention deficit hyperactivity disorder. She has disclosed her struggles with coping with intense depression and thoughts of suicide after the sudden death of three ex-boyfriends in quick succession. The accidental lethal overdose of her best friend Mac Miller and death of her grandmother in 2020 further intensified her suicidal thoughts and demotivated her from making songs. She has described the music industry as "one of the most stressful, psychosis-inducing". SZA finds solace through prayer and music, which helped her work toward self-acceptance.

Due to her upbringing, SZA has practiced several religious beliefs throughout her life. She believes in a "higher power or presence [...] that's running and moving the world like a well-oiled machine," regardless of religion. She has practiced and identified with Christianity, and she considers herself Muslim. Apart from Abrahamic faiths, she incorporates Hinduism in her personal belief system. In 2020, she hosted an online meditation session with Lizzo on Instagram Live, where SZA played a Tibetan singing bowl. She went to a silent retreat in India in 2025, refraining from social media use for over a week and practicing samyama all the while. She wears a Linga Bhairavi pendant to get a positive energy, which was given by the Isha Foundation. To maintain her wellness, she does yoga.

SZA is known for keeping her dating life private. Her known former partners include Drake, whom she dated in 2009. Another is an unnamed fashion designer, with whom she was in an on-again, off-again relationship for eleven years. Of those eleven, they were engaged for five. She attributes the beginning of her career in part to him, who helped finance her everyday needs; she described their relationship as codependent. The two broke up around 2018, sending SZA in a catastrophizing state because he was a "rock in [her] life" and "nobody understood [her] the way he did". "Nobody Gets Me" was written about him, as were many other songs from SOS.

== Discography ==
- Ctrl (2017)
- SOS (2022)

== Filmography ==
- One of Them Days (2025)
- CoComelon: The Movie (2027)

== Tours ==
Headlining

- Ctrl the Tour (2017–2018)
- SOS Tour (2023–2024)

Co-headlining

- The Championship Tour (with Top Dawg Entertainment artists) (2018)
- Grand National Tour (with Kendrick Lamar) (2025)

Supporting

- Coldplay – Ghost Stories Tour (2014)
- Jhené Aiko – Enter the Void Tour (2014)
- Jessie J – Sweet Talker Tour (2015)
- Bryson Tiller – Set It Off Tour (2017)

== Achievements ==
In her career, SZA has received seven Grammy Awards, a Golden Globe nomination, and an Academy Award nomination. She has earned one American Music Award, six Billboard Music Awards, four MTV Video Music Awards, and six BET Awards. SOS remains the album with the most nominations (14), as well as the album with the most nominated individual tracks (9). She received the "Rulebreaker Award" and "Women of the Year" at the Billboard Women in Music event in 2019 and 2023, respectively. SZA has also won the Soul Train Music Award for Best New Artist in 2017. Billboard later ranked her at number 18 on its 2025 "Top 100 Women Artists of the 21st Century" list.

In September 2022, SZA was included as one of the rising stars on the Time 100 Next List. At the 2022 Grammy Awards, SZA won Best Pop Duo/Group Performance with Doja Cat for their collaboration "Kiss Me More". In 2023, Rolling Stone ranked SZA at number 180 on its list of the "200 Greatest Singers of All Time". At the 2025 Grammy Awards, SZA won Best R&B Song for her single "Saturn".
