= Top Dawg Entertainment discography =

- Studio albums: 26
- EPs: 6
- Compilation albums: 2
- Singles: 37
- Music videos: 84
- Mixtapes: 17

The discography of Top Dawg Entertainment, an American independent record label, consists of 26 studio albums, 2 compilation album, 6 extended plays (EP), 17 mixtapes, 37 singles and 84 music videos. Overall the label has sold more than three million records in the US alone.

== Studio albums ==
The following is a list of albums released through Top Dawg Entertainment. Additional record label involvement is also specified.

Year	Album details	Peak chart positions										Certification	Sales	
Year	Album details	US	US R&B	US Rap	AUS	CAN	FRA	NZ	SWI	UK	UK R&B	Certification	Sales	
2011	ScHoolboy Q – Setbacks: Released: January 11, 2011; Label: Top Dawg; Format: Digital download	100	25	12	—	—	—	—	—	—	—		US: 17,000	
2011	Ab-Soul – Longterm Mentality: Released: April 5, 2011; Label: Top Dawg; Format: Digital download	189	73	69	—	—	—	—	—	—	—			
2011	Kendrick Lamar – Section.80: Released: July 2, 2011; Label: Top Dawg; Format: CD, digital download	113	21	13	—	—	—	—	—	—	—	RIAA: Gold	US: 500,000	
2011	Jay Rock – Follow Me Home: Released: July 26, 2011; Label: Top Dawg, Strange Music; Format: CD, digital download	83	18	10	—	—	—	—	—	—	—		US: 14,000	
2012	ScHoolboy Q – Habits & Contradictions: Released: January 14, 2012; Label: Top Dawg; Format: CD, digital download	111	25	16	—	—	—	—	—	—	—		US: 48,000	
2012	Ab-Soul – Control System: Released: May 11, 2012; Label: Top Dawg; Format: CD, digital download	91	12	9	—	—	—	—	—	—	—		US: 27,000	
2012	Kendrick Lamar – good kid, m.A.A.d city: Released: October 22, 2012; Label: Top Dawg, Aftermath, Interscope; Format: CD, LP, digital download	2	1	1	23	2	57	7	38	16	2	RIAA: 3× Platinum; BPI: Gold; MC: Gold	US: 3,000,000	
2014	ScHoolboy Q – Oxymoron: Released: February 25, 2014; Label: Top Dawg, Interscope; Format: CD, LP, digital download	1	1	1	11	1	123	7	24	23	4	RIAA: Platinum	US: 1,000,000	
2014	Ab-Soul – These Days...: Released: June 24, 2014; Label: Top Dawg; Format: CD, digital download	11	2	2	—	—	—	—	—	96	7		US: 31,000	
2015	Kendrick Lamar – To Pimp a Butterfly: Released: March 15, 2015; Label: Top Dawg, Aftermath, Interscope; Format: CD, LP, digital download	1	1	1	1	1	17	1	3	1	1	RIAA: Platinum; BPI: Gold; ARIA: Gold	US: 1,000,000	
2015	Jay Rock – 90059: Released: September 11, 2015; Label: Top Dawg; Format: CD, digital download	16	2	1	—	—	—	—	—	—	17		US: 52,000	
2016	ScHoolboy Q – Blank Face LP: Released: July 8, 2016; Label: Top Dawg, Interscope; Format: CD, digital download	2	1	1	9	2	87	5	—	36	5	RIAA: Gold	US: 500,000	
2016	Isaiah Rashad – The Sun's Tirade: Released: September 2, 2016; Label: Top Dawg; Format: CD, digital download	17	4	2	—	39	199	21	62	116	16		US: 19,000	
2016	Lance Skiiiwalker – Introverted Intuition: Released: October 18, 2016; Label: Top Dawg; Format: CD, digital download	—	—	—	—	—	—	—	—	—	—			
2016	Ab-Soul – Do What Thou Wilt.: Released: December 9, 2016; Label: Top Dawg; Format: CD, digital download	34	9	6	—	—	—	48	—	—	—		US: 10,000	
2017	Kendrick Lamar – Damn: Released: April 14, 2017; Label: Top Dawg, Aftermath, Interscope; Format: CD, LP, digital download	1	1	1	2	1	3	2	2	2	1	RIAA: 3× Platinum; BPI: Gold	US: 3,000,000	
2017	SZA – Ctrl: Released: June 9, 2017; Label: Top Dawg, RCA; Format: CD, LP, digital download	3	2	—	40	11	166	15	96	50	11	RIAA: 3× Platinum	US: 3,000,000	
2018	SiR – November: Released: January 18, 2018; Label: Top Dawg; Format: CD, digital download	—	—	—	—	—	—	—	—	—	—			
2018	Jay Rock – Redemption: Released: June 15, 2018; Label: Top Dawg, Interscope; Format: CD, LP, digital download	13	9	8	37	20	—	33	68	72	—		US: 31,000	
2018	Reason – There You Have It: Released: September 28, 2018; Label: Top Dawg; Format: CD, digital download	—	—	—	—	—	—	—	—	—	—			
2019	ScHoolboy Q – CrasH Talk: Released: April 26, 2019; Label: Top Dawg, Interscope; Format: CD, LP, digital download	3	1	1	11	5	50	6	17	27	—			
2019	SiR – Chasing Summer: Released: August 30, 2019; Label: Top Dawg; Format: CD, digital download	64	33	5	—	—	—	—	—	—	—			
2020	Reason – New Beginnings: Released: October 9, 2020; Label: Top Dawg; Format: CD, digital download, streaming	167	—	—	—	—	—	—	—	—	—			
2021	Isaiah Rashad – The House Is Burning: Released: July 30, 2021; Label: Top Dawg, Warner; Format: CD, digital download, streaming	7	4	—	32	13	—	12	28	55	36			
2022	Kendrick Lamar – Mr. Morale & the Big Steppers: Released: May 13, 2022; Label: Top Dawg, pgLang, Aftermath, Interscope; Format: CD, digital download, streaming	1	1	1	1	1	3	1	2	2	1			
2022	SZA – SOS: Released: December 9, 2022; Label: Top Dawg, RCA; Format: CD, digital download, streaming	1	1	1	1	1	26	1	3	2	2	RIAA: 3× Platinum	US: 3,000,000	
2022	Ab-Soul – Herbert: Released: December 16, 2022; Label: Top Dawg, Format: CD, digital download, streaming	—	—	—	—	—	—	—	—	—	—			
2023	Lance Skiiiwalker – Audiodidactic: Released: February 10, 2023; Label: Top Dawg; Format: CD, digital download, streaming	—	—	—	—	—	—	—	—	—	—			
2024	ScHoolboy Q – Blue Lips: Released: March 1, 2024; Label: Top Dawg, Interscope; Format: CD, LP, digital download, streaming	13	6	—	72	33	128	18	26	45	22			
2024	SiR – Heavy: Released: March 22, 2024; Label: Top Dawg; Format: CD, digital download, streaming	120	49	—	—	—	—	—	—	—	—			
2024	Ab-Soul – Soul Burger: Released: November 8, 2024; Label: Top Dawg; Format: CD, digital download, streaming	—	—	—	—	—	—	—	—	—	—			
2025	Kal Banx – Rhoda: Released: August 15, 2025; Label: Top Dawg; Format: Digital download, streaming	—	—	—	—	—	—	—	—	—	—			
2026	Isaiah Rashad – It's Been Awful: Released: May 1, 2026; Label: Top Dawg, Warner; Format: CD, digital download, streaming	18	7	—	87	—	—	—	—	—	—	—	—	—
"—" denotes a recording that did not chart or was not released in that territory.

== Reissues ==
Year	Album details	Peak chart positions
Year	Album details	NOR
2024	Devin Malik – Deadstock: Alt Ending: Released: December 6, 2024; Label: Top Dawg, BMR; Format: Digital download, streaming	—
2024	SZA – SOS Deluxe: Lana: Released: December 20, 2024; Label: Top Dawg, RCA; Format: CD, LP, digital download, streaming	4
2025	SiR – Heavy Deluxe: The Light: Released: April 4, 2025; Label: Top Dawg; Format: Digital download, streaming	—
"—" denotes a recording that did not chart or was not released in that territory.

== Compilation albums ==
Year	Album details	Peak chart positions									Certifications	Sales
Year	Album details	US	US R&B	US Rap	AUS	CAN	NZ	SWI	UK	UK R&B	Certifications	Sales
2016	Kendrick Lamar – untitled unmastered.: Released: March 4, 2016; Label: Top Dawg, Aftermath, Interscope; Format: CD, LP, digital download	1	1	1	3	1	5	9	7	2		US: 202,000
2018	Kendrick Lamar and Various Artists – Black Panther: The Album: Released: February 9, 2018; Label: Top Dawg, Aftermath, Interscope; Format: CD, LP, digital download	1	1	1	2	1	2	7	-	-	Platinum	US: 1,000,000
"—" denotes a recording that did not chart or was not released in that territory.

== EPs ==
Year	Album details	Peak chart positions					Sales
Year	Album details	US	US R&B	US Rap	UK	UK R&B	Sales
2009	Kendrick Lamar – Kendrick Lamar: Released: December 31, 2009; Label: Top Dawg; Format: Digital download	—	—	—	—	—	
2014	Isaiah Rashad – Cilvia Demo: Released: January 28, 2014; Label: Top Dawg; Format: CD, digital download	40	9	6	—	30	US: 26,000
2014	SZA – Z: Released: April 8, 2014; Label: Top Dawg; Format: CD, digital download	39	9	—	197	32	US: 12,600
2016	SiR – HER: Released: October 6, 2016; Label: Top Dawg; Format: Digital download	—	—	—	—	—	
2017	SiR – HER TOO: Released: February 10, 2017; Label: Top Dawg; Format: Digital download	—	—	—	—	—	
2019	Zacari – Run Wild Run Free: Released: March 15, 2019; Label: Top Dawg; Format: Digital download	—	—	—	—	—	
2021	Ray Vaughn – Peer Pressure: Released: August 25, 2021; Label: Top Dawg; Format: Digital download	—	—	—	—	—	
2021	Lance Skiiwalker – Tales From the Telescope Chapter 1: Rebirth: Released: September 17, 2021; Label: Top Dawg; Format: CD, LP, digital download						
2021	Lance Skiiwalker – Tales From The Telescope Chapter 2: Internal Shine: Released: December 15, 2021; Label: Top Dawg; Format: CD, LP, digital download						
2022	Doechii – She / Her / Black Bitch: Released: August 5, 2022; Label: Top Dawg, Capitol; Format: Streaming, digital download	—	—	—	—	—	
2024	Alemeda – FK IT: Released: September 20, 2024; Label: Top Dawg, Warner; Format: Streaming, digital download	—	—	—	—	—	

== Mixtapes ==
Year	Album details
2006	Jay Rock - Watts Finest Vol. I: Released: May 18, 2006
2006	Jay Rock - Watts Finest Vol. II: The Nickerson Files: Released: September 6, 2006
2007	Kendrick Lamar - Training Day (as K.Dot): Released: 2007
2007	Jay Rock - Watts Finest Vol. III: The Watts Riots: Released: May 8, 2007
2007	Jay Rock & Kendrick Lamar - No Sleep 'Til NYC: Released: December 24, 2007
2008	Top Dawg - Do It Nigga Squad Vol. 1: Released: May 10, 2008
2008	Jay Rock - Coming Soon to a Hood Near You: Released: August 6, 2008
2009	Ab-Soul - Longterm: Released: January 8, 2009
2009	Kendrick Lamar - C4 (as K.Dot): Released: January 30, 2009
2009	Jay Rock - Coming Soon 2 a Hood Near You: Released: February 9, 2009
2009	Schoolboy Q - Gangsta & Soul: Released: May 14, 2009
2009	Top Dawg - All Rize to tha Top: Released: April 9, 2009
2009	Jay Rock - Gudda Muzik: Released: May 26, 2009
2010	Jay Rock - From Hood Tales to the Cover of XXL: Released: March 22, 2010
2010	Ab-Soul - Longterm 2: Lifestyles of the Broke and Almost Famous: Released: June 28, 2010
2010	Kendrick Lamar – Overly Dedicated: Released: September 14, 2010; Label: Top Dawg; Format: Digital download; Chart positions: #72 US R&B/Hip-Hop Albums
2010	Jay Rock – Black Friday: Released: November 26, 2010; Label: Top Dawg, Strange Music; Format: Digital download
2021	Kal Banx - Keep It In The Family: Released: August 13, 2021; Label: Top Dawg; Format: Streaming, digital download
2024	Doechii - Alligator Bites Never Heal: Released: August 30, 2024; Label: Top Dawg, Capitol; Format: Streaming, digital download; Chart positions: #12 US Billboard 200
2025	Ray Vaughn - The Good, The Bad, The Dollar Menu: Released: April 25, 2024; Label: Top Dawg; Format: Streaming, digital download

== Singles ==
List of singles as lead artist, with selected chart positions and certifications, showing year released and album name
Title	Year	Peak chart positions									Certifications	Album
Title	Year	US	US R&B	US Rap	AUS	CAN	FRA	NZ	UK	UK Hip Hop/R&B	Certifications	Album
"All My Life (In the Ghetto)" Jay Rock (featuring Lil Wayne & will.i.am)	2008	—	110	—	—	—	—	—	—	—		Follow Me Home
"Hood Gone Love It" Jay Rock (featuring Kendrick Lamar)	2011	—	118	—	—	—	—	—	—	—		Follow Me Home
"HiiiPower" Kendrick Lamar	2011	—	—	—	—	—	—	—	—	—		Section.80
"Druggy's wit Hoes Again" Schoolboy Q (featuring Ab-Soul)	2011	—	—	—	—	—	—	—	—	—		Habits & Contradictions
"Hands on the Wheel" Schoolboy Q (featuring ASAP Rocky)	2012	—	105	—	—	—	—	—	—	—		Habits & Contradictions
"The Recipe" Kendrick Lamar (featuring Dr. Dre)	2012	103	38	23	—	—	—	—	—	—		Good Kid, M.A.A.D City
"Swimming Pools (Drank)" Kendrick Lamar	2012	17	3	1	67	99	59	—	57	11	RIAA: Gold; BPI: Silver	Good Kid, M.A.A.D City
"Backseat Freestyle" Kendrick Lamar	2013	106	29	22	—	—	—	—	79	17		Good Kid, M.A.A.D City
"Poetic Justice" Kendrick Lamar (featuring Drake)	2013	26	8	6	—	—	—	—	—	—	RIAA: Gold	Good Kid, M.A.A.D City
"You're Gone" Ab-Soul (featuring JMSN)	2013	—	—	—	—	—	—	—	—	—		Non-album single
"Bitch, Don't Kill My Vibe" Kendrick Lamar	2013	32	9	7	—	—	—	—	178	28		Good Kid, M.A.A.D City
"Yay Yay" Schoolboy Q	2013	—	49	—	—	—	—	—	—	—		Oxymoron
"Collard Greens" Schoolboy Q (featuring Kendrick Lamar)	2013	92	28	21	—	—	—	—	184	—		Oxymoron
"Man of the Year" Schoolboy Q	2013	62	16	7	—	—	—	—	—	—		Oxymoron
"Break the Bank" Schoolboy Q	2014	115	32	6	—	—	—	—	—	—		Oxymoron
"Studio" Schoolboy Q (featuring BJ the Chicago Kid)	2014	38	10	5	—	—	—	—	—	—		Oxymoron
"I" Kendrick Lamar	2014	39	11	8	48	61	68	31	20	3		To Pimp a Butterfly
"Hell of a Night" Schoolboy Q	2014	—	46	—	—	—	—	—	—	—		Oxymoron
"Pay for It" Jay Rock (featuring Kendrick Lamar)	2014	—	57	—	—	—	—	—	—	—		Non-album single
"The Blacker the Berry" Kendrick Lamar	2015	66	25	16	—	—	—	—	83	13		To Pimp a Butterfly
"King Kunta" Kendrick Lamar	2015	58	20	11	32	52	80	24	56	9		To Pimp a Butterfly
"Money Trees Deuce" Jay Rock	2015	—	—	—	—	—	—	—	—	—		90059
"Gumbo" Jay Rock	2015	—	—	—	—	—	—	—	—	—		90059
"Alright" Kendrick Lamar	2015	81	24	20	—	—	—	—	109	20		To Pimp a Butterfly
"90059" Jay Rock (featuring Lance Skiiiwalker)	2015	—	—	—	—	—	—	—	—	—		90059
"Nelly" Isaiah Rashad	2015	—	—	—	—	—	—	—	—	—		Non-album single
"These Walls" Kendrick Lamar	2015	94	34	25	—	—	—	—	77	—		To Pimp a Butterfly
"Smile" Isaiah Rashad	2016	—	—	—	—	—	—	—	—	—		Non-album single
"Untitled 07 | Levitate" Kendrick Lamar	2016	90	27	16	—	—	197	—	93	20		Untitled Unmastered
"Groovy Tony" Schoolboy Q	2016	—	—	—	—	—	—	—	—	—		Blank Face
"That Part" Schoolboy Q (featuring Kanye West)	2016	40	13	8	—	51	—	—	—	—		Blank Face
"Free Lunch" Isaiah Rashad	2016	—	—	—	—	—	—	—	—	—		The Sun's Tirade
"Huey Knew" Ab-Soul (featuring Dash)	2016	—	—	—	—	—	—	—	—	—		Do What Thou Wilt
"Braille" Ab-Soul (featuring Bas)	2016	—	—	—	—	—	—	—	—	—		Do What Thou Wilt
"Drew Barrymore" SZA	2017	—	—	—	—	—	—	—	—	—		Ctrl
"Love Galore" SZA (featuring Travis Scott)	2017	32	4	—	—	84	—	—	—	—		Ctrl
"The Weekend" SZA	2017	29	1	—	49	63	—	—	55	33		Ctrl
"All the Stars" Kendrick Lamar & SZA	2018	7	2	—	2	7	24	2	5	2		Black Panther: The Album
"King's Dead" Jay Rock, Kendrick Lamar, Future & James Blake	2018	21	—	—	—	—	—	—	—	—		Black Panther: The Album
"Pray For Me" Kendrick Lamar (featuring The Weeknd)	2018	7	—	—	—	—	—	—	—	—		Black Panther: The Album
"Broken Clocks" SZA	2018	82	7	—	—	—	—	—	—	—		Ctrl
"Garden (Say It like Dat)" SZA	2018	—	20	—	—	—	—	—	—	—		Ctrl
"Hit Different" SZA (featuring Ty Dolla Sign)	2020	29	3	—	84	55	—	— (Note: "Hit Different" did not enter the NZ Top 40 Singles Chart but peaked at number two on the NZ Hot Singles Chart.)	55	—		Non-album single
"Good Days" SZA	2020	9	3	—	7	12	174	3	13	5		SOS
"I Hate U" SZA	2021	7	1	—	16	14	—	8	38	—		SOS
"Persuasive" Doechii	2022	—	—	—	—	—	—	—	—	—		She / Her / Black Bitch
"Shirt" SZA	2022	11	3	—	20	20	—	15	17	4		SOS
"Nobody Gets Me" SZA	2023	10	2	—	16	20	—	10	27	5		SOS
"Kill Bill" SZA	2023	1	1	—	1	3	34	1	3	1		SOS
"Snooze" SZA	2023	2	1	—	21	11	—	5	18	6		SOS
"Saturn" SZA	2024	6	1	—	8	8	—	5	15	3		Lana
"Nissan Altima" Doechii	2024	73	26	—	19	79	—	24	66	26		Alligator Bites Never Heal
"Drive" SZA	2024	51	3	—	—	76	—	— (Note: "Drive" did not enter the NZ Singles Chart but peaked at number six on the NZ Hot Singles Chart.)	—	26		Lana
"30 for 30" SZA (with Kendrick Lamar)	2025	22	1	—	77	42	—	35	68	12		Lana
"BMF" SZA	2025	29	—	—	17	28	—	10	21	2		Lana
"Denial Is a River" Doechii	2025	21	7	—	16	27	171	—	9	2		Alligator Bites Never Heal
"Anxiety" Doechii	2025	10	—	—	1	13	6	1	3	—		Alligator Bites Never Heal
"—" denotes a recording that did not chart or was not released in that territory.
