= Jay Rock discography =

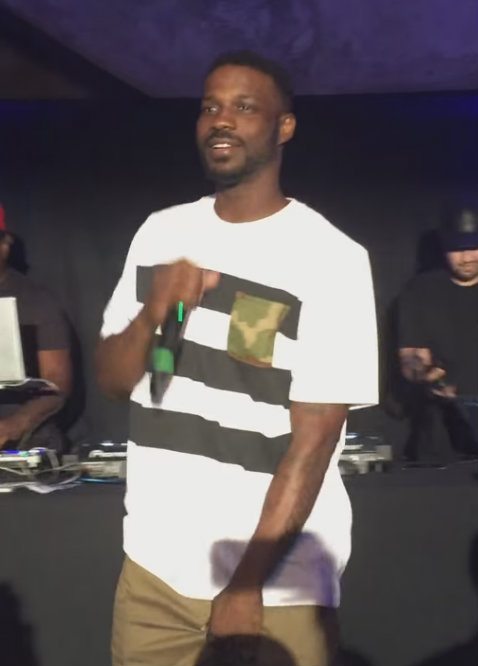
- Jay Rock performing in September 2015
- Studio albums: 3
- Singles: 12
- Music videos: 30
- Mixtapes: 10
- Promotional singles: 2

American rapper Jay Rock has released three studio albums, 10 mixtapes, 13 singles (including six as a featured artist) and 30 music videos.

== Albums ==
=== Studio albums ===
List of studio albums, with selected chart positions and certifications
| Title | Album details | Peak chart positions | | | | | Certifications |
| Title | Album details | US | US R&B/HH | US Rap | AUS | UK | Certifications |
|---|---|---|---|---|---|---|---|
| Follow Me Home | Released: July 26, 2011; Label: Top Dawg, Strange Music; Format: CD, digital download | 83 | 18 | 10 | — | — | |
| 90059 | Released: September 11, 2015; Label: Top Dawg; Format: CD, digital download | 16 | 2 | 1 | — | — | |
| Redemption | Released: June 15, 2018; Label: Top Dawg, Interscope; Format: CD, LP, digital download | 13 | 9 | 8 | 37 | 72 | RIAA: Gold |
| Eastside Johnny | To be released: Expected 2026; Label: Top Dawg, Interscope; Format: CD, streaming | To Be Released | | | | | |
| | "—" denotes a recording that did not chart or was not released in that territory. | | | | | | |

== Mixtapes ==
| Title | Mixtape details |
|---|---|
| Watts Finest Vol. I | Released: May 18, 2006; Format: Digital download |
| Watts Finest Vol. II: The Nickerson Files | Released: September 6, 2006; Format: Digital download |
| Watts Finest Vol. III: The Watts Riots | Released: May 8, 2007; Format: Digital download |
| No Sleep 'Til NYC (with K.Dot) | Released: December 24, 2007; Format: Digital download |
| Do It Nigga Squad Vol. 1 (with Top Dawg Ent.) | Released: May 10, 2008; Format: Digital download |
| Coming Soon to a Hood Near You | Released: August 6, 2008; Format: Digital download |
| Coming Soon 2 a Hood Near You | Released: February 9, 2009; Format: Digital download |
| Gudda Muzik | Released: May 26, 2009; Format: Digital download |
| From Hood Tales to the Cover of XXL | Released: March 22, 2010; Format: Digital download |
| Black Friday | Released: November 26, 2010; Format: Digital download |

== Singles ==
=== As lead artist ===
List of singles as lead artist, with selected chart positions, showing year released and album name
| Title | Year | Peak chart positions | | | | | | Certifications | Album |
| Title | Year | US | US R&B/HH | US Main. R&B/HH | US R&B/HH Digital | CAN | UK | Certifications | Album |
|---|---|---|---|---|---|---|---|---|---|
| "All My Life (In the Ghetto)" (featuring Lil Wayne and will.i.am) | 2008 | — | — (Note: "All My Life (In the Ghetto)" did not enter the Billboard Hot R&B/Hip-Hop Songs chart, but peaked at number 10 on the Bubbling Under R&B/Hip-Hop Singles chart.) | — | — | — | — | | Follow Me Home |
| "Hood Gone Love It" (featuring Kendrick Lamar) | 2011 | — | — (Note: "Hood Gone Love It" did not enter the Billboard Hot R&B/Hip-Hop Songs chart, but peaked at number 18 on the Bubbling Under R&B/Hip-Hop Singles chart.) | — | — | — | — | | Follow Me Home |
| "Pay for It" (featuring Kendrick Lamar and Chantal) | 2014 | — | — (Note: "Pay for It" did not enter the Billboard Hot R&B/Hip-Hop Songs chart, but peaked at number seven on the Bubbling Under R&B/Hip-Hop Singles chart.) | — | 26 | — | — | | Non-album single |
| "Money Trees Deuce" | 2015 | — | 35 | — | — | — | — | | 90059 |
| "Gumbo" | 2015 | — | — | — | — | — | — | | 90059 |
| "90059" | 2015 | — | — | — | — | — | — | | 90059 |
| "King's Dead" (with Kendrick Lamar, Future and James Blake) | 2018 | 21 | 13 | 7 | 15 | 23 | 50 | RIAA: 3× Platinum; BPI: Gold; MC: 2× Platinum | Black Panther: The Album / Redemption |
| "Win" | 2018 | — (Note: "Win" did not enter the Billboard Hot 100, but peaked at number 20 on the Bubbling Under Hot 100 Singles chart.) | — (Note: "Win" did not enter the Billboard Hot R&B/Hip-Hop Songs chart, but peaked at number four on the Bubbling Under R&B/Hip-Hop Singles chart.) | 16 | — | — | — | RIAA: Gold | Redemption |
| "The Bloodiest" | 2018 | — | — | — | — | — | — | | Redemption |
| "Tap Out II [Open Verse]" (featuring Jeremih) | 2018 | — | — | 27 | — | — | — | | Redemption |
| "Eastside" (featuring Kal Banx) | 2023 | — | — | — | — | — | — | | TBA |
| "Too Fast (Pull Over)" (with Anderson .Paak featuring Latto) | 2023 | — | — | — | — | — | — | | TBA |
| "Blowfly" (featuring Ab-Soul) | 2023 | — | — | — | — | — | — | | TBA |
| "Still That Way" | 2023 | — | — | — | — | — | — | | TBA |
"—" denotes a recording that did not chart or was not released in that territory.

=== As featured artist ===
List of singles as a featured artist, showing year released and album name
| Title | Year | Certifications | Album |
|---|---|---|---|
| "I'm a Rida" (L-Boy featuring Jay Rock, Glasses Malone and Jah Free) | 2009 | | The Thump Ridaz Mix |
| "Look out the Window" (Serius Jones featuring Jay Rock) | 2010 | | Non-album single |
| "Paper" (Tech N9ne featuring Jay Rock and Joe Vertigo) | 2010 | | The Gates Mixed Plate |
| "The Life" (Yukmouth featuring Ya Boy, Jay Rock and London) | 2010 | | Free at Last |
| "California Zone" (Montana Montana Montana featuring Jay Rock) | 2010 | | Non-album single |
| "My People" (Kendrick Lamar featuring Jay Rock) | 2011 | BPI: Platinum | Bastards of the Party (Original Motion Picture Soundtrack) |
| "Swimming Pools (Black Hippy Remix)" (Kendrick Lamar featuring ScHoolboy Q, Jay Rock and Ab-Soul) | 2012 | | Good Kid, M.A.A.D. City |
| "Show Summ" (League of Starz featuring Problem, Skeme, Freddie Gibbs, Jay Rock, Glasses Malone and Bad Lucc) | 2013 | | LOS.FM |
| "I Just Wanna Party" (YG featuring Jay Rock and ScHoolboy Q) | 2014 | RIAA: Gold | My Krazy Life |
| "Red Rags" (Tech N9ne featuring Kutt Calhoun, Big Scoob and Jay Rock) | 2014 | | Strangeulation |
| "OMG" (BJ the Chicago Kid featuring Jay Rock) | 2016 | | Non-album single |
| "Nothin" (Problem featuring Jay Rock and Jack Harlow) | 2020 | | Coffee & Kush, Vol. 2 |

=== Promotional singles ===
List of promotional singles, showing year released and album name
| Title | Year | Album |
|---|---|---|
| "YOLA" | 2012 | Non-album singles |
| "Parental Advisory" | 2014 | Non-album singles |
| "Easy Bake" (featuring Kendrick Lamar and SZA) | 2015 | 90059 |

== Other charted songs ==
List of songs, with selected chart positions, showing year released and album name
| Title | Year | Peak chart positions | | | Certifications | Album |
| Title | Year | US Bub. | US R&B/HH | US R&B/HH Digital | Certifications | Album |
|---|---|---|---|---|---|---|
| "Money Trees" (Kendrick Lamar featuring Jay Rock) | 2012 | 19 | 35 | — | RIAA: Platinum; ARIA: 7× Platinum | Good Kid, M.A.A.D City |
| "Vice City" (featuring Black Hippy) | 2015 | — | — | 42 | | 90059 |
| "Bing James" (Lil Wayne featuring Jay Rock) | 2020 | 7 | — | — | | Funeral |
| "—" denotes a recording that did not chart or was not released in that territory. | | | | | | |

== Guest appearances ==
List of non-single guest appearances, with other performing artists, showing year released and album name
| Title | Year | Other artist(s) | Album |
|---|---|---|---|
| "What'z Next?" | 2006 | 2Pac, A3 | Pac's Life |
| "Top Dawg Ent." | 2008 | BO, K-Dot, Ab-Soul | The Rebirth of BO |
| "Catch a Body" | 2008 | BO, K-Dot | The Rebirth of BO |
| "Shake Niggaz" | 2008 | BO | The Rebirth of BO |
| "West Really" | 2008 | Eastwood, The Game | Making History |
| "Better Dayz (West Coast Remix)" | 2008 | The Game, Ya Boy, Crooked I, K-Dot, MC Juice, Dubb Union, Ab-Soul | Rap or Die 6 |
| "Army All by Myself" | 2009 | Nipsey Hussle, 2Pac, June Summers | Bullets Ain't Got No Name, Vol. 3 |
| "Hussle in the House (Remix)" | 2009 | Nipsey Hussle, Maino | —N/a |
| "Nothing Less" | 2009 | Big Pooh, K-Dot, Ab-Soul | The Delightful Bars |
| "Top Dawg Cypha" | 2009 | Schoolboy Q, Lil Louie, Ab-Soul, Kendrick Lamar | Gangsta & Soul |
| "Before It All Ends" | 2009 | Glasses Malone, Snoop Dogg | Nightmare on Seven Street Mixtape |
| "Homage to Dr. Dre" | 2009 | Focus..., Crooked I, Kida, Marsha Ambrosius | The Pay Homage LP |
| "Number One" | 2009 | Laws | Don Cannon Presents: 4:57 AM |
| "Gutter" | 2009 | Ab-Soul | Longterm |
| "I Do This" | 2009 | Kendrick Lamar | Kendrick Lamar (EP) |
| "Hoodie" | 2010 | Omarion | Ollusion |
| "Layed Out" | 2010 | DJ Kay Slay, Bun B, Dorrough, Papoose, Twista, Young Chris | More Than Just a DJ |
| "Bullets Whistle" | 2010 | Tony Yayo | Gun Powder Guru 2: The Remixes |
| "Lifestyle" | 2010 | Ab-Soul | —N/a |
| "No Pressure" | 2010 | Ab-Soul | Longterm 2: Lifestyles of the Broke and Almost Famous |
| "Gudda" | 2010 | Gudda Gudda, Menace | Back 2 Guddaville |
| "Rep 2 tha Fullest" | 2010 | Freddie Gibbs | Str8 Killa |
| "Ugly" | 2010 | DJ Whoo Kid, Xzibit, Trick Trick | Napalm |
| "Ain't Playin" | 2010 | J-Hood | —N/a |
| "Down for the Block" | 2010 | Tech N9ne, Big Scoob, Krizz Kaliko, Kutt Calhoun | Bad Season |
| "Holla (Remix)" | 2011 | Willie B, Kida, Busta Rhymes, Little Brother, Kurupt, Crooked I, Talib Kweli | I'm Not a Producer |
| "Put the Mic Down" | 2011 | DJ Kay Slay, Kendrick Lamar, Fred the Godson, Jon Connor | The Soul Controller |
| "What's tha Word" | 2011 | Schoolboy Q | Setbacks |
| "Constipation" | 2011 | Ab-Soul, Kendrick Lamar, Schoolboy Q | Longterm Mentality |
| "Don't Fuck With Me" | 2011 | Travis Barker, Paul Wall, Kurupt | Give the Drummer Some |
| "Poppin'" | 2011 | Nina B. | —N/a |
| "If I Die Tonight" | 2011 | C. Vanardo | Bastards of the Party (Original Motion Picture Soundtrack) |
| "DAMU'" | 2011 | Big Scoob, Messy Marv, Bumpy Knuckles, Skatterman | Damn Fool |
| "You Owe Like Pookie" | 2011 | Tech N9ne, Kutt Calhoun | All 6's and 7's |
| "Kocky" | 2011 | Tech N9ne, Krizz Kaliko, Kutt Calhoun | Welcome to Strangeland |
| "2 Raw" | 2012 | Schoolboy Q | Habits & Contradictions |
| "Lust Demons" | 2012 | Ab-Soul, BJ the Chicago Kid | Control System |
| "Back in the Days" | 2012 | K-Young | Treacherous Records Presents: The Mint Room |
| "The Corner" | 2012 | Talib Kweli | Attack the Block |
| "Highway to Hell" | 2012 | DJ Kay Slay, Schoolboy Q, Kendrick Lamar | The Return of the Gate Keeper |
| "Somebody Tell ‘Em" | 2012 | Nottz, W.O.L.L. | —N/a |
| "Krazy" | 2012 | Freddie Gibbs, Jadakiss | Baby Face Killa |
| "The Heart Pt. 3 (Will You Let It Die?)" | 2012 | Kendrick Lamar, Ab-Soul | —N/a |
| "T.N.T." (Remix) | 2012 | ¡Mayday!, Black Thought, Stevie Stone, Jon Connor, DJ Khaled | Smash and Grab |
| "Red + Blue Equals Green" | 2013 | DJ Kay Slay, Glasses Malone, Roccett, Compton Menace | Grown Man Hip Hop Part 2 (Sleepin' with the Enemy) |
| "Why" | 2013 | Terrace Martin, Wendi Vaughn | —N/a |
| "Ballin'" | 2013 | Bow Wow, Kendrick Lamar | Greenlight 5 |
| "Certified Live" | 2013 | Freddie Gibbs, G-Wiz | ESGN |
| "When the Goons Come Out" | 2013 | Noah Jones | The Hookah Lounge, Vol. 1 |
| "Never Be the Same" | 2013 | Ty Dolla Sign, Peter Lee Johnson | Beach House 2 |
| "Shot You Down (Remix)" | 2014 | Isaiah Rashad, Schoolboy Q | Cilvia Demo |
| "Los Awesome" | 2014 | Schoolboy Q | Oxymoron |
| "Niggaz Hate" | 2014 | DJ Kay Slay, Lock Smith, Trae tha Truth | The Last Hip Hop Disciple |
| "Feelin' Us" | 2014 | Ab-Soul, RaVaughn | These Days... |
| "Gang Bang Anyway" | 2015 | The Game, Schoolboy Q | The Documentary 2.5 |
| "Tity and Dolla" | 2016 | Isaiah Rashad, Hugh Augustine | The Sun's Tirade |
| "Money" | 2016 | E-40, Mozzy | The D-Boy Diary: Book 2 |
| "Can't Tell Me Nothing" | 2017 | DJ Kay Slay, Meet Sims, Young Buck, Raekwon | The Big Brother |
| "Momma We Made It" | 2017 | Mozzy | 1 Up Top Ahk |
| "Nobody Knows" | 2018 | Mozzy, Dcmbr | Spiritual Conversations (EP) |
| "Raised a Fool" | 2019 | Kembe X, Ab-Soul, Zacari | —N/a |
| "Bing James" | 2020 | Lil Wayne | Funeral |
| "Memphis to L.A." | 2020 | Juicy J, Project Pat | The Hustle Continues |
| "True Story" | 2021 | Isaiah Rashad, Jay Worthy | The House Is Burning |
| "Own Two" | 2021 | C.S. Armstrong | —N/a |
| "Is What It Is" | 2022 | Reason | —N/a |
| "At It Again (Remix)" | 2023 | Reason | —N/a |
| "Black Dynamite" | 2025 | 2 Eleven | —N/a |
| "Klown Dance" | 2025 | Ray Vaughn | The Good, The Bad, The Dollar Menu |

== Music videos ==
=== As lead artist ===
List of music videos, showing year released and director
| Title | Year | Director(s) |
|---|---|---|
| "All My Life (In the Ghetto)" (featuring Lil Wayne) | 2008 | |
| "Blood Walk" | 2008 | |
| "Blood Nigga" | 2008 | |
| "No Mask On" (featuring Ab-Soul) | 2009 | James Curtis |
| "Dollars Makes Sence" (featuring Glasses Malone) | 2009 | |
| "Change Gone Come" | 2009 | Urban Spielberg |
| "112 Bars" | 2009 | Dee.Jay.Dave |
| "Anti Social" | 2009 | Court Dunn |
| "Mandatory" (featuring Kendrick Lamar and Ab-Soul) | 2009 | James Curtis |
| "No Joke" (featuring Ab-Soul) | 2010 | |
| "Real Bloods" | 2010 | |
| "Roll On" (featuring Kendrick Lamar and Major James) | 2010 | |
| "Diary of a Broke Nigga" (featuring Kendrick Lamar and Giddy) | 2010 | |
| "Life's a Gamble" | 2011 | |
| "Say Wassup" (featuring Ab-Soul, Kendrick Lamar and Schoolboy Q) | 2011 | |
| "Just Like Me" | 2011 | |
| "Hood Gone Love It" (featuring Kendrick Lamar) | 2011 | |
| "Code Red" (featuring Kendrick Lamar) | 2011 | |
| "Boomerang" | 2011 | |
| "Money" (featuring J. Black) | 2011 | |
| "Elbows" | 2011 | |
| "YOLA" | 2012 | Fredo Tovar, Scott Fleishman |
| "Parental Advisory" | 2014 | Dave Free, Christian San Jose |
| "Money Trees Deuce" | 2015 | Jack Begert |
| "90059" | 2015 | PANAMÆRA, Dave Free |
| "Vice City" | 2015 | Joe Weil |
| "The Ways" | 2015 | Joe Weil |
| "King's Dead" | 2018 | Dave Free, Jack Begert |
| "WIN" | 2018 | Dave Meyers, Dave Free |
| "The Bloodiest" | 2018 | Colin Tilley |
| "Rotation 112" | 2018 | Daniel Russell |
| "WOW Freestyle" | 2018 | Jack Begert |
| "For What It's Worth" | 2018 | Matilda Finn |
| "Eastside" | 2023 | Omar Jones |
| "Blowfly" | 2023 | Carlos Acosta |
| "Still That Way" | 2023 | Omar Jones |

=== As featured artist ===
List of music videos, showing year released and director
| Title | Year | Director(s) |
|---|---|---|
| "What's tha Word" (Schoolboy Q featuring Jay Rock and Ab-Soul) | 2010 | Matt Plunkett |
| "Black Lip Bastard" (Remix)" (Ab-Soul featuring Jay Rock, Kendrick Lamar and Schoolboy Q) | 2012 | The ICU |
| "Never Be the Same" (Ty Dolla Sign featuring Jay Rock) | 2013 | Jerome D |

== See also ==
- Black Hippy discography
