= Ab-Soul discography =

Hip hop recording artist discography

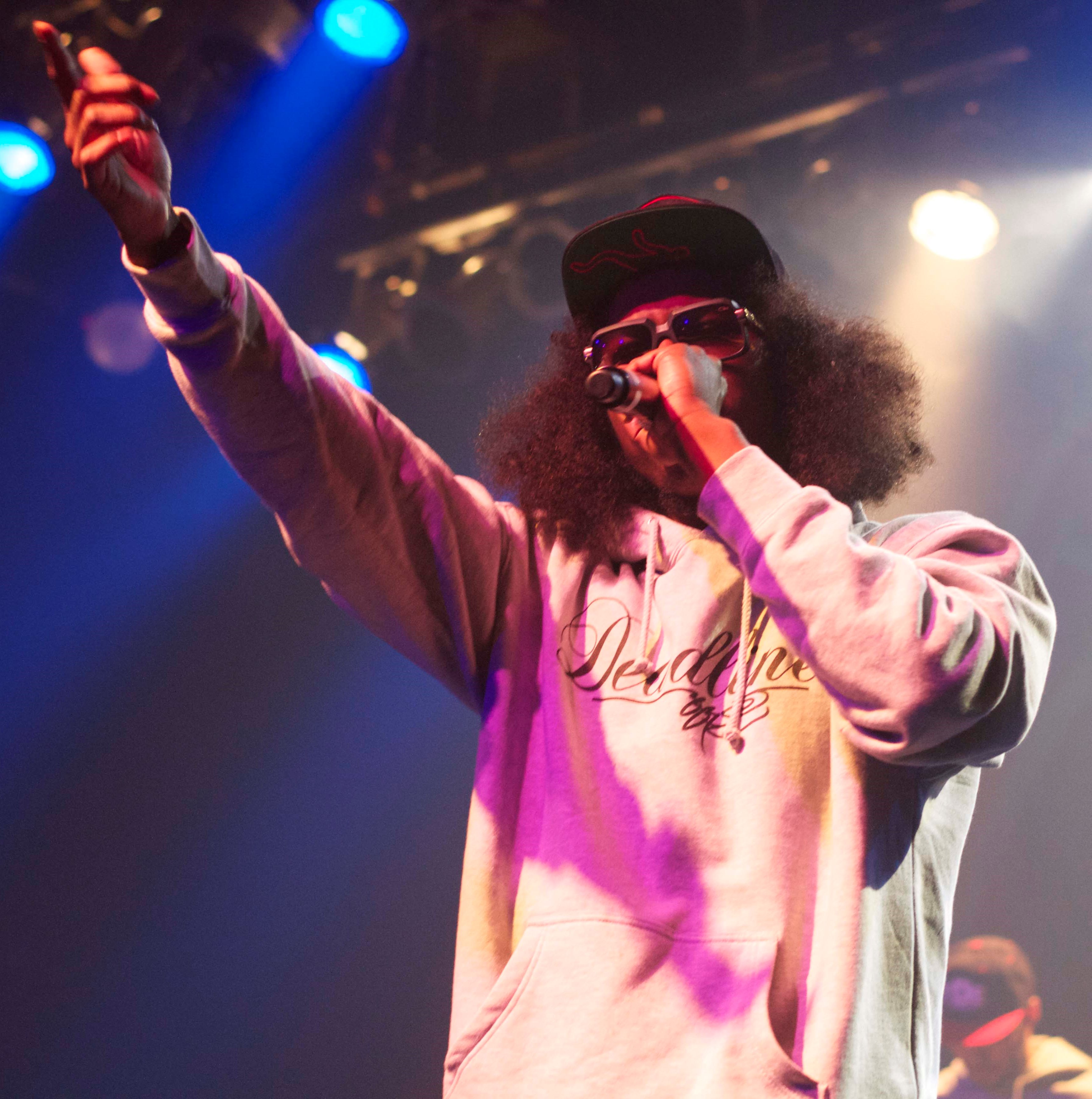
- Ab-Soul performing in Toronto in 2013
- Studio albums: 6
- Singles: 17
- Music videos: 30
- Mixtapes: 2

The discography of Ab-Soul, an American hip hop recording artist, consists of six studio albums, two mixtapes, seventeen singles (including ten as a featured artist) and 30 music videos. Ab-Soul's first full-length project was a mixtape titled Longterm. The mixtape was released in 2009, as a free download via mixtape-sharing websites.

== Studio albums ==
List of albums, with selected chart positions
Title	Album details	Peak chart positions					
Title	Album details	US	US R&B/HH	US Rap	US Ind.	UK	UK R&B
Longterm Mentality	Released: April 5, 2011; Label: Top Dawg; Format: Digital download, streaming	—	73	—	—	—	—
Control System	Released: May 11, 2012; Label: Top Dawg; Format: CD, digital download, streaming	91	12	9	13	—	—
These Days...	Released: June 24, 2014; Label: Top Dawg; Format: CD, digital download, streaming	11	2	2	3	96	7
Do What Thou Wilt.	Released: December 9, 2016; Label: Top Dawg; Format: CD, digital download, streaming	34	9	6	6	—	—
Herbert	Released: December 16, 2022; Label: Top Dawg; Format: CD, digital download, streaming	—	—	—	—	—	—
Soul Burger	Released: November 8, 2024; Label: Top Dawg; Format: CD, digital download, streaming	—	—	—	—	—	—
"—" denotes a recording that did not chart or was not released in that territory.

== Mixtapes ==
List of albums, with selected details
Title	Album details
Longterm	Released: January 8, 2009; Format: Free download; Label: Top Dawg
Longterm 2: Lifestyles of the Broke and Almost Famous	Released: June 28, 2010; Format: Free download; Label: Top Dawg

== Singles ==
=== As lead artist ===
List of singles as lead artist, with showing year released and album name
Title	Year	Album
"Moscato" (featuring Kendrick Lamar)	2011	Longterm Mentality
"Rapper Shit" (with Kendrick Lamar)	2011	Non-album singles
"Black Lip Bastard"	2012	Non-album singles
"Terrorist Threats" (featuring Jhené Aiko and Danny Brown)	2012	Control System
"Pineal Gland"	2012	Control System
"SOPA" (featuring ScHoolboy Q)	2012	Control System
"Nibiru"	2012	Non-album singles
"You're Gone" (with JMSN)	2013	Non-album singles
"The End Is Near" (featuring Mac Miller)	2013	Non-album singles
"Christopher Droner" (featuring Jay Rock)	2013	Non-album singles
"Dub Sac"	2014	These Days...
"Tree of Life"	2014	These Days...
"Stigmata" (featuring Action Bronson and Asaad)	2014	These Days...
"Hunnid Stax" (featuring ScHoolboy Q)	2014	These Days...
"Huey Knew" (featuring Da$h)	2016	Do What Thou Wilt.
"Braille" (featuring Bas)	2016	Do What Thou Wilt.
"Talk to Em 2" (with Daylyt, UTK and Loaded Lux)	2018	Non-album singles
"Dangerookipawaa Freestyle"	2020	Non-album singles
"Back at It" (with Kembe X and ICECOLDBISHOP)	2020	Non-album singles
"Hollandaise"	2022	Herbert
"Moonshooter" (with Joey Badass)	2022	Herbert
"Do Better" (with Zacari)	2022	Herbert
"Gang'Nem" (with Fre$h)	2022	Herbert
"Squeeze 1st 2"	2024	Soul Burger
"All That" (featuring JasonMartin and Thirsty P)	2024	Soul Burger
"Crazier" (featuring JID)	2024	Soul Burger

=== As featured artist ===
List of singles as a featured artist, with showing year released and album name
Title	Year	Album
"Druggy's wit Hoes Again" (ScHoolboy Q featuring Ab-Soul)	2011	Habits & Contradictions
"Riddims" (Jesse Medina featuring Ab-Soul)	2012	Non-album singles
"Save" (Mod Sun featuring Ab-Soul, Rich Hil and Metasota)	2012	Non-album singles
"Riddims 2.0" (Jesse Medina featuring Ab-Soul, Sir Michael Rocks and Anya Kvitka)	2014	Meet Jesse Medina
"Champagne Water" (Nikki Jean featuring Ab-Soul)	2014	Champagne Water
"Housewives (Remix)" (Bas featuring Ab-Soul)	2016	Non-album singles
"2morrow" (Kevo Hendricks featuring Ab-Soul and Kenhood)	2016	Non-album singles
"Illest Nigga Ever" (Kush Kelz featuring Ab-Soul)	2016	I Think the Neighbors Know
"Good Shit" (Nightlife featuring Ab-Soul)	2016	Non-album single
"Really Doe" (Danny Brown featuring Kendrick Lamar, Ab-Soul and Earl Sweatshirt)	2016	Atrocity Exhibition
"Raised a Fool" (Kembe X featuring Jay Rock, Ab-Soul and Zacari)	2019	Non-album single
"Flick It Up" (Reason featuring Ab-Soul)	2019	New Beginnings
"Trapped In" (Reason featuring Ab-Soul and Boogie)	2020	Non-album single
"Who Wants What" (Russ featuring Ab-Soul)	2020	Chomp
"Motions" (Zacari featuring Ab-Soul)	2023	Non-album single
"Church" (Lance Skiiiwalker featuring Ab-Soul)	2023	Audiodidactic
"Sandcastles" (Ray Vaughn featuring Ab-Soul)	2023	Non-album singles
"Blowfly" (Jay Rock featuring Ab-Soul)	2023	Non-album singles
"Hidden Stages" (T.F featuring Ab-Soul)	2023	Feelin' the Power
"I'm Not Perfect" (SiR featuring Ab-Soul)	2024	Heavy
"Makin Plays" (2 Eleven featuring Ab-Soul and Trizz)	2024	Non-album singles
"Introverted Extrovert" (Kembe X featuring Ab-Soul)	2024	Non-album singles
"Runnin' All Fades" (Coyote featuring Ab-Soul and Python P)	2025	YoteLAndia
"Norbit" (Bas & The Hics featuring Ab-Soul)	2025	Melanchronica
"Still" (Joey Badass featuring Ab-Soul and Rapsody)	2025	Lonely at the Top
"Insecure" (YG featuring JID and Ab-Soul)	2026	The Gentlemen's Club

== Other charted and certified songs ==
Title	Year	Peak chart positions		Album
Title	Year	US	US R&B /HH	Album
"Bloody Waters" (with Anderson .Paak and James Blake)	2018	— (Note: "Bloody Waters" did not enter the Billboard Hot 100, but peaked at number 16 on the Bubbling Under Hot 100 chart.)	— (Note: "Bloody Waters" did not enter the Hot R&B/Hip-Hop Songs chart, but peaked at number five on the Bubbling Under R&B/Hip-Hop Singles chart.)	Black Panther: The Album
"Pi" (J. Cole featuring Daylyt and Ab-Soul)	2024	62	29	Might Delete Later

== Guest appearances ==
List of non-single guest appearances, with other performing artists, showing year released and album name
Title	Year	Artist(s)	Album
"What Happen"	2007	Jay Rock, K-Dot	Watts Finest Vol. III: The Watts Riots
"Enjoy Life"	2007	Jay Rock, K-Dot	No Sleep 'Til NYC
"C.R.E.A.M."	2007	Jay Rock, K-Dot	No Sleep 'Til NYC
"The Real Hip Hop" (Ab-Soul Freestyle)	2007	—N/a	No Sleep 'Til NYC
"Dead Presidents III"	2007	Jay Rock, K-Dot	No Sleep 'Til NYC
"Top Dawg Ent."	2007	Jay Rock, K-Dot, BO	No Sleep 'Til NYC
"Like My Style"	2008	BO	The Rebirth of BO
"Top Dawg Ent."	2008	BO, Jay Rock, K-Dot	The Rebirth of BO
"Try Me"	2008	Schoolboy Q, Jay Rock, K-Dot, Punch	Schoolboy Turned Hustla
"Hip Hop"	2008	Schoolboy Q	Schoolboy Turned Hustla
"Mandatory"	2009	Jay Rock, K-Dot	30 Day Takeover
"TDE Roll Call"	2009	Jay Rock, K-Dot, Schoolboy Q	30 Day Takeover
"Play This on the Radio"	2009	Jay Rock	30 Day Takeover
"I Do It 4 Hip Hop"	2009	Jay Rock, K-Dot, Schoolboy Q	30 Day Takeover
"I Know"	2009	Jay Rock, K-Dot	30 Day Takeover
"West Coast Wu-Tang"	2009	K-Dot, Punch	C4
"Take Off Ur Pants"	2009	—N/a	C4
"Still Hustlin"	2009	K-Dot, Jay Rock	C4
"Welcome 2 the C4"	2009	K-Dot, Jay Rock, Schoolboy Q, BO	C4
"Famous Pipe Game"	2009	K-Dot	C4
"Spacebars"	2009	Curtiss King, Young Rock	The Storm on Mars
"Nothing Less"	2009	Rapper Big Pooh, Jay Rock, K-Dot	The Delightful Bars
"Top Dawg Cypha"	2009	Schoolboy Q, Lil Louie, Jay Rock, K-Dot	Gangsta & Soul
"P & P"	2009	Kendrick Lamar	Kendrick Lamar (EP)
"Happy Medium"	2010	Alori Joh	The Love Religion
"Scumbags"	2010	Curtiss King, Stevie Crooks	Jet Pack on E
"No Joke"	2010	Jay Rock	Black Friday
"Fuck the Police"	2010	Jay Rock	Black Friday
"Hustle Man"	2010	Jay Rock	Black Friday
"Money Makin' Movies"	2010	Jay Rock	Black Friday
"Untold Story"	2010	—N/a	Big Drums Come Knockin
"P&P 1.5"	2010	Kendrick Lamar	Overly Dedicated
"El Camp 2"	2010	Tae Beast, Kendrick Lamar, Schoolboy Q	TheTaeBeastTape
"Druggys wit Hoes"	2011	ScHoolboy Q	Setbacks
"RapperPooh-a-lude"	2011	Rapper Big Pooh, Kendrick Lamar	Fat Boy Fresh Vol. 1: For Members Only
"Supernatural"	2011	Tommy Black	The Medkit
"Motherless Child"	2011	C. Vanardo	Bastards of the Party (Original Motion Picture Soundtrack)
"No Joke"	2011	Jay Rock	Follow Me Home
"Say Wassup"	2011	Jay Rock, ScHoolboy Q, Kendrick Lamar	Follow Me Home
"Ab-Soul's Outro"	2011	Kendrick Lamar	Section.80
"Life and Time"	2011	Murs	Love and Rockets, Vol. 1: The Transformation
"Rap Shit"	2012	Problem, Casey Veggies, Murs, ScHoolboy Q, Skeme, Terrace Martin	Swig Tape Volume.1
"Donnie Brasco"	2012	Fashawn, One-2	Treacherous Records Presents: The Mint Room
"Unnecessary"	2012	Childish Gambino, ScHoolboy Q	Royalty
"Bernie Mac"	2012	TiRon, Ayomari	The Cafeteria Line Presents HNGRY
"Mayan Omega"	2012	Rockstar Jones, Ghrimm	Greetings From Here
"Fair Fight"	2012	Strong Arm Steady & Statik Selektah, Jay Rock, ScHoolboy Q	Stereo Type
"Non-Fiction"	2012	Rapsody, Raheem DeVaughn	The Idea of Beautiful
"GODS"	2012	Jaye	Fiat Lvx
"Congregation"	2012	Talib Kweli, Black Thought	Attack the Block
"3rd Eye"	2012	Twista	Reloaded
"Scars N Stars"	2012	Colin Munroe, Kendrick Lamar	Unsung Hero
"Diamond"	2012	Smoke DZA	K.O.N.Y.
"iBang"	2012	Snake Hollywood	My Condolences...
"Jimmy Iovine"	2012	Macklemore & Ryan Lewis	The Heist
"The Heart Pt. 3 (Will You Let It Die?)"	2012	Kendrick Lamar, Jay Rock	—N/a
"Enter the Void"	2012	Joey Bada$$	—N/a
"Cut from a Different Cloth"	2012	Joe Budden	A Loose Quarter
"All the Time"	2013	Mac Miller	—N/a
"Fantastic"	2013	Short Dawg	Southern Flame Spitta 5
"Hallucinogen"	2013	Meek DeMeo	Capital Vices
"Broken Dreams"	2013	Tsu Surf, Fred the Godson	A New Mood
"Sail" (TDE Remix)	2013	Awolnation, Kendrick Lamar	Megalithic Symphony (Deluxe Version)
"Money Team"	2013	Larry Fisherman, Smoke DZA, Da$H	S.H.O.W.TIME
"Smoke Again"	2013	Chance the Rapper	Acid Rap
"Back Then"	2013	ScHoolboy Q	DJ Drama Presents: XXL 2013's Freshmen Class
"Matches"	2013	Mac Miller	Watching Movies with the Sound Off
"In a Minute"	2013	Sir Michael Rocks, Da$H	While You Wait...
"On God"	2013	Kevo da Kid, Boldy James	High Class Life, Low Life Mentality
"Killin' Y'all"	2013	Vince Staples, Larry Fisherman	Stolen Youth
"Sleep"	2013	Vince Staples, Larry Fisherman, Da$H, Mac Miller	Stolen Youth
"Whalé"	2013	Da$H, RetcH	V.I.C.E.S
"Don't Ya Just Love It"	2013	Pete Rock & Camp Lo	80 Blocks From Tiffany's Pt. 2
"Ab-Soul's Intro"	2013	Terrace Martin	3ChordFold
"Never Know"	2013	Rapsody, Nipsey Hussle, Terrace Martin	She Got Game
"That Shit"	2013	Young Rook	—N/a
"Like Me"	2013	Jae Crizz	—N/a
"Choke"	2013	Snake Hollywood	—N/a
"Sadderdaze"	2013	CJ Fly	Thee Way Eye See It
"Way Up Here"	2013	Danny Brown	Old
"Came Thru/Easily"	2013	Chuck Inglish, Mac Miller	Easily
"Through the Eyes of a G"	2013	Action Bronson	Blue Chips 2
"WTH"	2013	Jhené Aiko	Sail Out
"Ice.Moon Revisited"	2013	SZA	—N/a
"Short $ermons"	2013	Retch, Thelonious Martin	Polo Sporting Goods
"Holy Holy"	2013	Vic Mensa, BJ the Chicago Kid	Innanetape
"Dopamine"	2014	F.Y.I., Those Chosen	Yo! The Places You'll Go
"Lakers"	2014	Freddie Gibbs & Madlib, Polyester the Saint	Piñata
"Made in Black America"	2014	Common	—N/a
"Amen"	2014	Mac Miller, Da$H, Vince Staples, RetcH	—N/a
"Hearses"	2014	Smoke DZA	Dream. Zone. Achieve
"Thorns & Horns"	2014	Lupe Fiasco	—N/a
"TTG"	2014	A$ton Matthews	A$ton 3:16
"Apex"	2014	Nitty Scott, MC	The Art of Chill
"Alejandro Jodorowsky Flow"	2014	Asaad	Flowers II
"Camp Fire"	2014	Bill, Mac Miller	Vagrant
"Polo Jeans"	2014	Mac Miller, Earl Sweatshirt	Faces
"As I Unfold"	2014	Kembe X, Alex Wiley	Scion AV Presents: Kembe X
"Talk to Em"	2014	UTK, Loaded Lux	Feels Great to Be Dope
"Alarm Clock"	2014	Statik Selektah, Jon Connor, Logic, Francesca	What Goes Around
"10 Pints"	2014	Short Dawg, Mac Miller	NoDOZ
"Dat Sound Good"	2014	PRhyme, Mac Miller	PRhyme
"Addiction"	2014	Short Dawg	Drank Sinatra
"They.Resurrect.Over.New"	2015	Lupe Fiasco, Troi	Tetsuo & Youth
"Stix & Stones"	2015	B-Real	The Prescription
"BadGuyGoodGuy"	2015	Thelonious Martin, Retch	Wünderkid
"Top of the Diamond"	2015	Bad Lucc, Problem, Punch	Diamond Lane America
"Trouble"	2015	The Alchemist, Oh No, Aloe Blacc	Welcome to Los Santos
"All You Need"	2015	Statik Selektah, Action Bronson, Elle Varner	Lucky 7
"Two Matches"	2015	Mac Miller	GO:OD AM
"Dollar and a Dream"	2015	The Game	The Documentary 2
"Isis"	2016	Asaad	—N/a
"2 AM"	2016	Rapsody	Crown
"Bloody Waters"	2018	Anderson .Paak, James Blake	Black Panther: The Album
"Transgression"	2019	FifthGod, Da$H, Radamiz	The Fifth Tape
"One Way St."	2020	Jhené Aiko	Chilombo
"The Plug"	2023	Jay Worthy & Roc Marciano, Kokane	Nothing Bigger Than the Program
"Ain't Too Much to It"	2023	Statik Selektah, Bun B, Conway the Machine	Round Trip
"4 Characters"	2023	Canibus & Johnny Slash	Self-Licking Ice Cream Cone
"Pi"	2024	J. Cole, Daylyt	Might Delete Later
"Surf & Turf"	2024	Conway the Machine, T.F., Jay Worthy, 2-Eleven	Slant Face Killah
"Foux"	2024	ScHoolboy Q	Blue Lips
"Soul Circus/ Chupacabra"	2024	DJ Quik & JasonMartin	Chupacabra
"Rich Man Dreams"	2024	IDK	Bravado Intimo...
"Take Your Time"	2024	Nascent	Don't Grow Up Too Soon
"icarus Outro"	2024	Zacari	Bliss
"Don't Know"	2025	Driew	TBA
"Runnin' All Fades"	2025	Coyote, Python P	Yotelandia
"Latency"	2026	Ras Kass, Dina Rae	Leopard Eats Face
"Love Bomb"	2026	Jhené Aiko	Westside Whimsy

== Music videos ==
=== As lead artist ===
List of music videos, showing year released and director
Title	Year	Director(s)
"A Day in the Life"	2009	Dee.Jay.Dave
"Rush"	2010	Ramses Perryman
"Turn Me Up" (featuring Kendrick Lamar)	2010	Calmatic
"Drift Away"	2010	True Artistry Group
"Nothin New" (featuring Jhené Aiko)	2011	Calmatic
"Gone Insane"	2011	Fredo Tovar, Scott Fleishman
"Pineal Gland"	2012	Fredo Tovar, Scott Fleishman
"Empathy" (featuring JaVonte and Alori Joh)	2012	Jerome D
"Terrorist Threats" (featuring Jhené Aiko and Danny Brown)	2012	APLUS Filmz
"Black Lip Bastard" (Remix) (featuring Kendrick Lamar, ScHoolboy Q and Jay Rock)	2012	The ICU
"Illuminate" (featuring Kendrick Lamar)	2013	Fredo Tovar, Scott Fleishman
"Closure" (featuring Jhené Aiko)	2014	Jerome D
"Hunnid Stax" (featuring ScHoolboy Q)	2014	Adam Roberts
"Huey Knew"	2016	APLUS Filmz
"Braille" (featuring Bas)	2016	PANAMÆRA
"D.R.U.G.S."	2016	PANAMÆRA
"RAW (BackWoods)"	2016	APLUS Filmz
"Womanogamy"	2016	Yellow Nguyen
"Do Better"	2022	Omar Jones
"Gang'Nem" (featuring Fre$h)	2022	Omar Jones
"Fomf"	2022	Omar Jones, Onda
"It Be Like That"	2023	Ab-Soul
"Gotta Rap"	2023	Cordell Jomha
"Herbert"	2023	Omar Jones
"All That" (featuring JasonMartin and Thirsty P)	2024	Carlos Acosta

=== As featured artist ===
List of music videos, showing year released and director
Title	Year	Director(s)
"Mandatory" (Jay Rock featuring K-Dot and Ab-Soul)	2009	James Curtis
"P&P 1.5" (Kendrick Lamar featuring Ab-Soul)	2010	Jerome D
"What's the Word" (ScHoolboy Q featuring Jay Rock and Ab-Soul)	2010	Matt Plunkett
"Druggys wit Hoes" (Schoolboy Q featuring Ab-Soul)	2011	Ramses Perryman
"Say Wassup" (Jay Rock featuring Ab-Soul, ScHoolboy Q and Kendrick Lamar)	2011	Fredo Tovar
"Druggys wit Hoes Again" (ScHoolboy Q featuring Ab-Soul)	2012	Jerome D
"Non Fiction" (Rapsody featuring Raheem DeVaughn and Ab-Soul)	2013	Kenneth Price
"Smoke Again" (Chance the Rapper featuring Ab-Soul)	2013	illRoots
"Like Me" (Jae Crizz featuring Ab-Soul)	2013	Gordon Cowie Films
"Hearses" (Smoke DZA featuring Ab-Soul)	2014	Goldrush
"As I Unfold" (Kembe X featuring Ab-Soul and Alex Wiley)	2014	Yellow Nguyen
"Addiction" (Short Dawg featuring Ab-Soul)	2015	Jeff Reyes
"Flick It Up" (Reason featuring Ab-Soul)	2019	Jon Primo
"Trapped In" (Reason featuring Boogie and Ab-Soul)	2020	Jon Primo
"Who Wants What" (Russ featuring Ab-Soul)	2020	Joan Pabon
"Sandcastles" (Ray Vaughn featuring Ab-Soul)	2023	Jacob Rink
"Motion" (Zacari featuring Ab-Soul)	2023	Este
"Dollars Make Sense" (Glasses Malone featuring Jay Rock and Ab-Soul)	2023	A+ Films
"Hidden Stages" (T.F featuring Ab-Soul)	2023	Jazz Carter
"Blowfly" (Jay Rock featuring Ab-Soul)	2023	Carlos Acosta
"Makin Plays" (2 Eleven featuring Ab-Soul and Trizz)	2024	
"Introverted Extrovert" (Kembe X featuring Ab-Soul)	2024	Jazz Carter
"Don't Know" (Driew featuring Ab-Soul)	2025	Zammer
"Runnin' All Fades" (Coyote featuring Ab-Soul)	2025	PROCLUB
"Norbit" (Bas featuring Ab-Soul and The Hics)	2025	@kiva.corshen & @Nickfrmnowhre for The Fiends
"Still" (Joey Badass featuring Ab-Soul and Rapsody)	2025	Lew Good
"Latency" (Ras Kass and Ab-Soul featuring Dina Rae)	2026	Gifted Glitch

== See also ==
- Black Hippy discography
