= Ronald Colson =

American songwriter, producer, multi-instrumentalist

- Born: Atlantic City, New Jersey, United States
- Other names: Flip, Flippa, Flippa123
- Musical career
- Genres: R&B; soul; hip hop; pop
- Occupations: Songwriter; record producer; multi-instrumentalist

Ronald Colson, also known as Flippa, is an American songwriter, record producer, and multi-instrumentalist, best known for his frequent work with production team Pop & Oak, including Usher's "Good Kisser", Nicki Minaj's "Right by My Side", Chris Brown's "Bassline", and Brandy's "Beggin & Pleadin", as well as many other song and album contributions. Colson remains close to the production team, and still works with Pop Wansel frequently.

He is also known for work with Top Dawg Entertainment artists Kendrick Lamar (To Pimp a Butterfly opener "Wesley's Theory") and Jay Rock ("Money Trees Deuce").

== Selected songwriting and production credits ==
Title	Year	Artist	Album
"Just Remember"	2011	Trin-i-tee 5:7	Angel & Chanelle
"Blessing Me"	2011	Trin-i-tee 5:7	Angel & Chanelle
"I.F.U"	2012	Usher	Looking 4 Myself
"Bassline"	2012	Chris Brown	Fortune
"Numb" (Featuring Eminem)	2012	Rihanna	Unapologetic
"Right by My Side" (Featuring Chris Brown)	2012	Nicki Minaj	Pink Friday: Roman Reloaded
"Fall Asleep"	2012	Wiz Khalifa	O.N.I.F.C.
"Stackin'" (Featuring Juicy J)	2012	Wiz Khalifa	O.N.I.F.C.
"Good Kisser"	2014	Usher	Hard II Love
"Streets of London" (Featuring Skye Edwards & Lindsey Stirling)	2014	Marsha Ambrosius	Friends & Lovers
"Wonderful"	2014	Mary J. Blige	Think Like a Man Too Soundtrack
"Kiss and Make Up"	2014	Mary J. Blige	Think Like a Man Too Soundtrack
"Going Under"	2014	K. Michelle	Anybody Wanna Buy a Heart?
"Something About the Night"	2014	K. Michelle	Anybody Wanna Buy a Heart?
"Drake Would Love Me"	2014	K. Michelle	Anybody Wanna Buy a Heart?
"Chasing Time"	2014	Azealia Banks	Broke with Expensive Taste
"Deal"	2015	Miguel	Wildheart
"What's Normal Anyway"	2015	Miguel	Wildheart
"Leaves"	2015	Miguel	Wildheart
"Lighthouse"	2015	Jill Scott	Woman
"Wesley's Theory" (Featuring George Clinton & Thundercat)	2015	Kendrick Lamar	To Pimp a Butterfly
"Money Trees Deuce" (Featuring Lance Skiiiwalker)	2015	Jay Rock	90059
"Straight Up" (Featuring Jagged Edge)	2015	Ty Dolla Sign	Free TC
"Drive"	2015	Dornik	Dornik
"Job" (Featuring Anthony Hamilton & Jadakiss)	2015	August Alsina	This Thing Called Life
"Eldorado"	2016	Ro James	Eldorado
"Selfish"	2016	Twenty88	Twenty88
"Push It"	2016	Twenty88	Twenty88
"Talk Show"	2016	Twenty88	Twenty88
"Beggin & Pleadin"	2016	Brandy	Non-album single
"Dollar Bills" (Featuring Steve Lacy)	2017	Syd	Fin
"Treading Water" (Unreleased)	2017	Syd	Fin
"Anymore"	2017	Ella Mai	Ready EP
"Shockandawe"	2017	Miguel	Non-album single
"Forever I'm Ready"	2018	Jeremih	The Chocolate Box EP
"Take You There"	2018	H.E.R.	I Used to Know Her: Part 2 EP
"Can't Help Me"	2019	H.E.R.	I Used to Know Her
"Feel a Way"	2019	H.E.R.	I Used to Know Her
"Racks" (Featuring Cordae)	2019	H.E.R.	I Used to Know Her
"As I Am"	2019	H.E.R.	I Used to Know Her
"Have Mercy"	2019	Cordae	The Lost Boy
"Comfortable"	2020	H.E.R.	The Photograph Soundtrack
"We Made It"	2021	H.E.R.	Back of My Mind
"Back of My Mind" (Featuring Ty Dolla Sign)	2021	H.E.R.	Back of My Mind
"Process"	2021	H.E.R.	Back of My Mind
"Judgement Day"	2024	J. Cole	2014 Forest Hills Drive (10th Anniversary Edition)
"Final Destination"	2025	Teyana Taylor	Escape Room
"Go Girl" (With Latto & Doja Cat)	2025	Summer Walker	Finally Over It

== Awards and nominations ==
Year	Ceremony	Award	Result	Ref
2015	57th Annual Grammy Awards	Grammy Award for Best R&B Song ("Good Kisser")	Nominated	
2016	58th Annual Grammy Awards	Grammy Award for Album of the Year (To Pimp a Butterfly)	Nominated	
2021	Hollywood Music in Media Awards	Best Original Song in a TV Show/Limited Series ("Change")	Won	
2021	Guild of Music Supervisors Awards	Best Song Written and/or Recorded for Television ("Change")	Nominated	
2022	64th Annual Grammy Awards	Grammy Award for Album of the Year (Back of My Mind)	Nominated	
2022	Children's and Family Emmy Awards	Outstanding Short-Form Program (Credited Writer - We the People)	Won	
