= Parental Advisory (disambiguation) =

Parental Advisory is a warning label placed on audio recordings that contain explicit content.

Parental Advisory may also refer to:

- "Parental Advisory" (song), by Jay Rock, 2014
- Parental Advisory: Explicit Lyrics (album), a 1990 album by George Carlin
- P.A. (group), an American hip-hop trio

== See also ==
- Warning: Parental Advisory, a 2002 American television film
