= Easy Bake (song) =

Promotional single by Jay Rock featuring Kendrick Lamar and SZA

from the album 90059
- Released: August 27, 2015
- Genre: Gangsta rap
- Length: 4:51
- Label: Top Dawg
- Songwriters: Johnny McKinzie; Kendrick Duckworth; Solana Rowe
- Producers: Skhye Hutch; ThankGod4Cody; Tyran Donaldson; Chris Calor; SmokeyGotBeatz

"Easy Bake" is a song by American rapper Jay Rock, taken from his second studio album 90059. It features guest appearances from Rock's Top Dawg Entertainment label-mates Kendrick Lamar and SZA. The song, which was produced by Skhye Hutch, ThankGod4Cody, The Antydote, Chris Calor and SmokeyGotBeatz, was released as a promotional single on August 27, 2015.

== Release ==
The song was first premiered for a limited audience during a listening session for 90059 in Los Angeles on August 16, 2015. On August 26, the first part of the song was premiered for the rest of the world, when Jay Rock played the song on radio station Shade 45. The full song was made available the next day on the iTunes Store, as an instant gratification track for those who purchased the album.

== Remix ==
On November 25, 2015, the song was remixed with new production and a new verse by Kendrick Lamar, accompanied with a new title "Traffic Jam (Easy Bake Remix)".
