= Money Trees Deuce =

Single by Jay Rock featuring Lance Skiiiwalker

from the album 90059
- Released: June 3, 2015
- Genre: Gangsta rap
- Length: 5:21
- Label: TDE
- Songwriter(s): Johnny McKinzie
- Producer(s): Flippa; J Proof

Jay Rock singles chronology
"Pay for It" (2014)	"Money Trees Deuce" (2015)	"Gumbo" (2015)

"Money Trees Deuce" is a song by American hip hop recording artist Jay Rock, released as the first single from his second studio album, 90059 (2015). The song, produced by Flippa and J Proof, is a follow-up to Kendrick Lamar's 2012 song, "Money Trees" featuring Jay Rock. It features vocals by Lance Skiiiwalker.

== Track listing ==
- Digital download
1. "Money Trees Deuce" – 5:21

== Charts ==
Chart (2015)	Peak position
US Hot R&B/Hip-Hop Songs (Billboard)	35
