= Black Hippy =

American hip hop supergroup from California

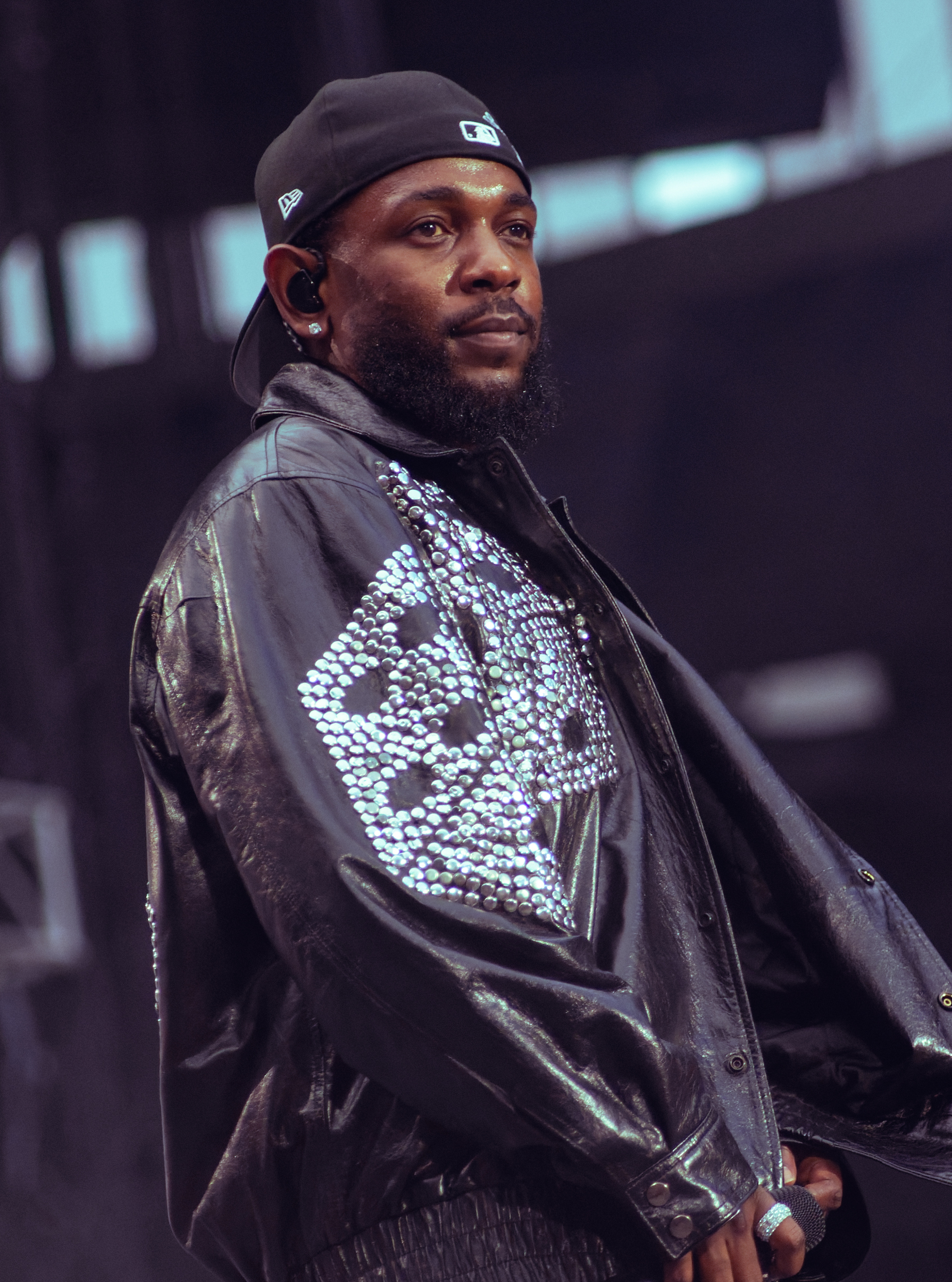
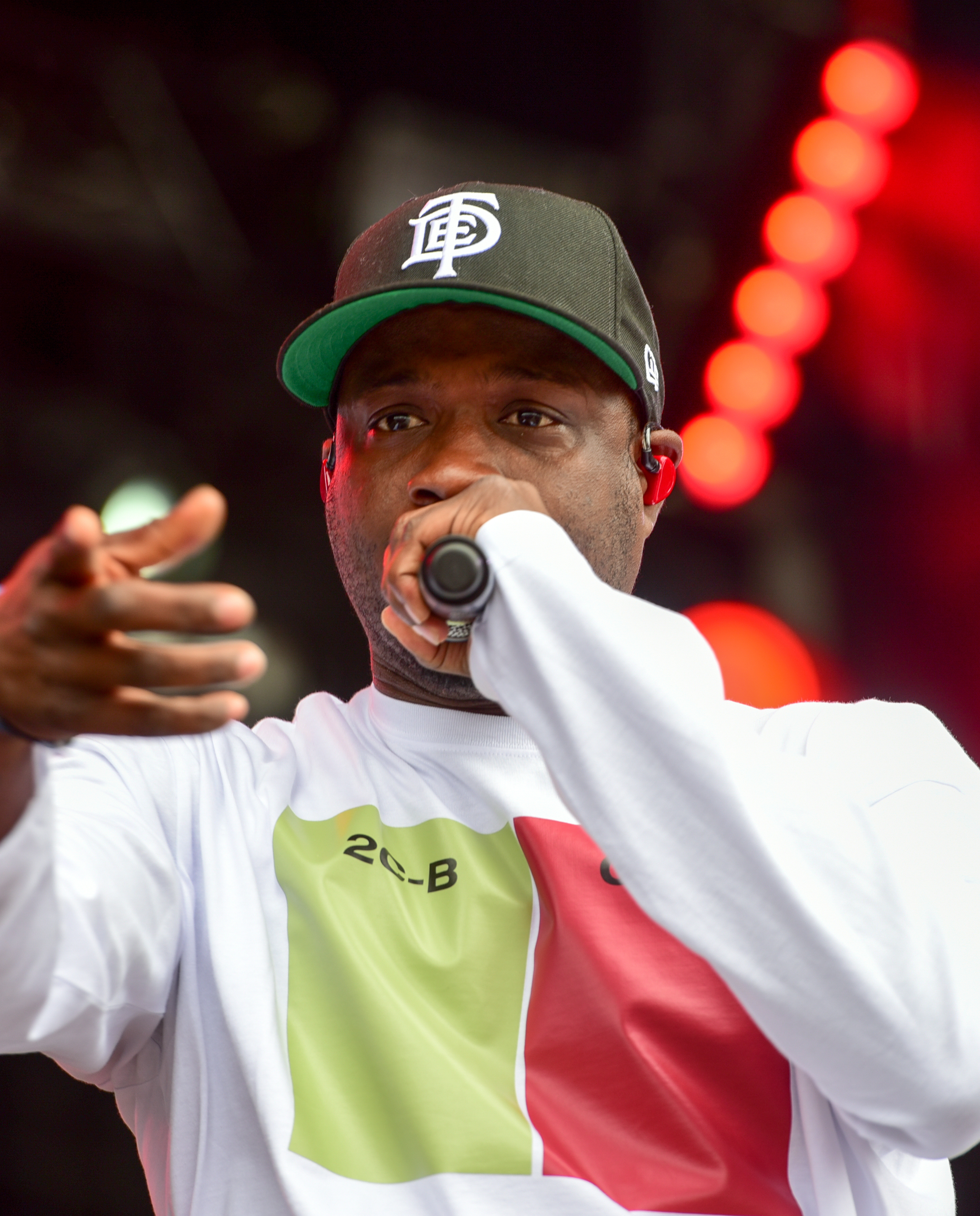
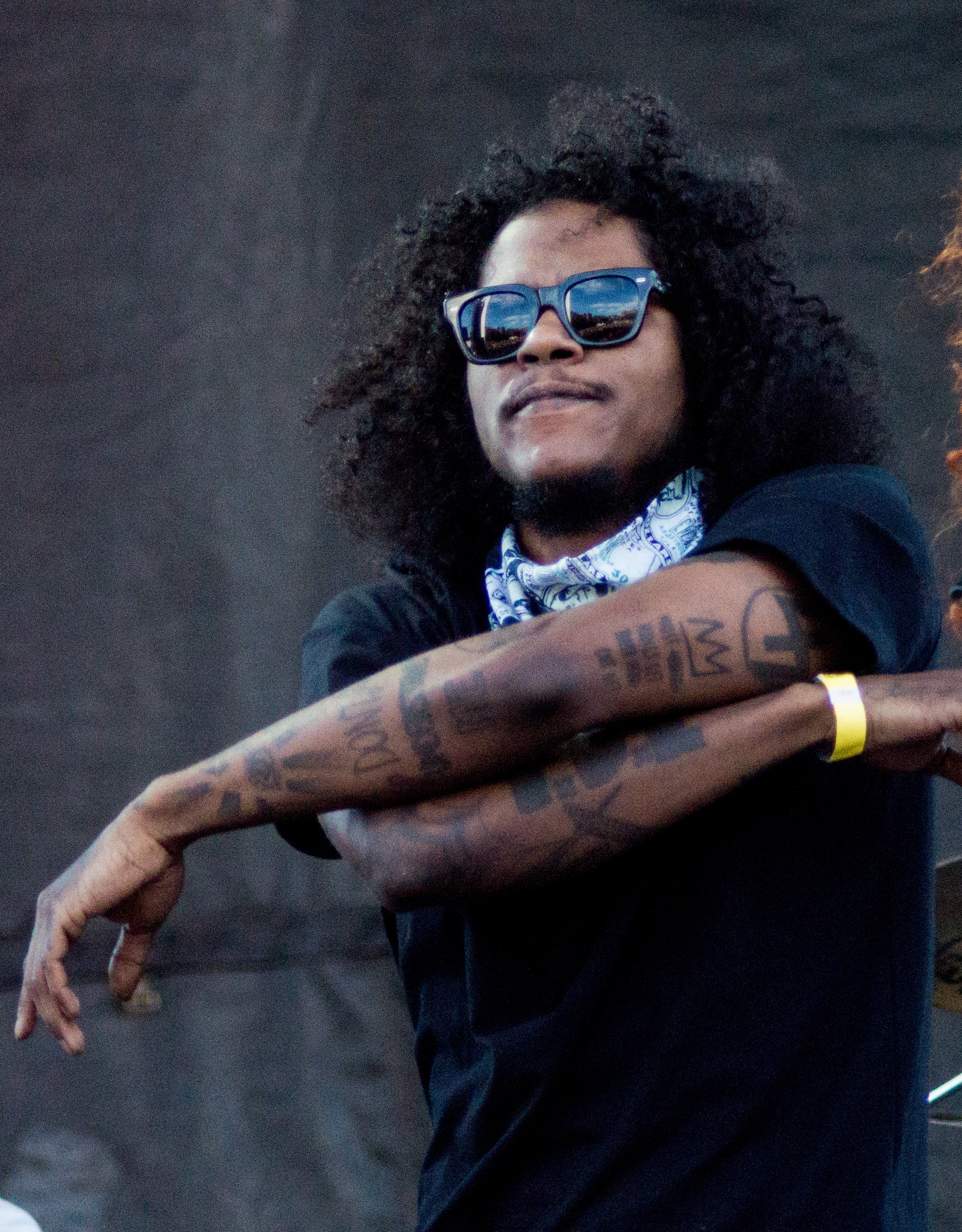
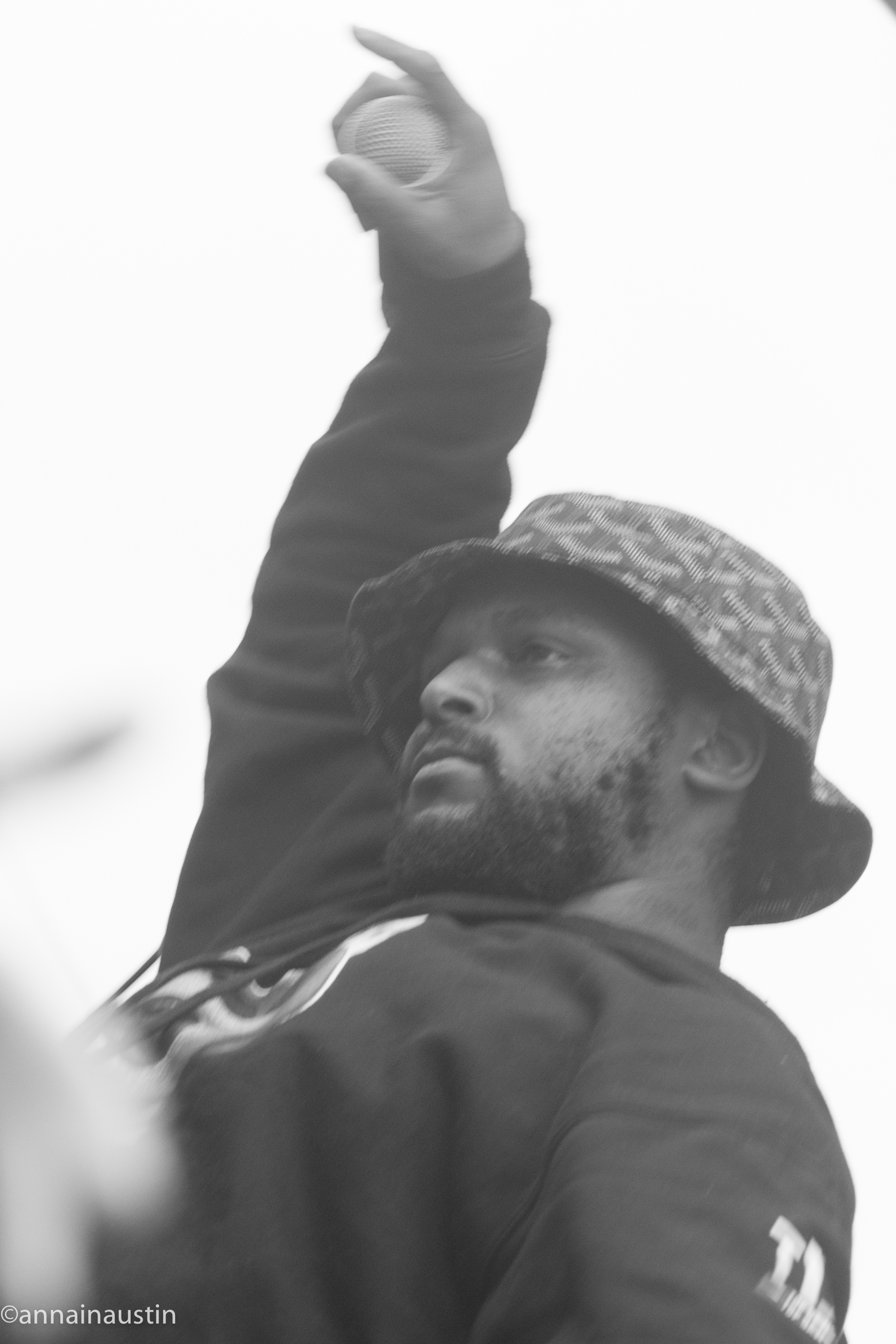
- Top: Kendrick Lamar, Jay Rock; Bottom: Ab-Soul, Schoolboy Q

Background information
- Origin: Los Angeles, California, U.S.
- Genre: Hip hop
- Years active: 2008–2022; 2024 (Note: 2024: One-time reunion)
- Label: Top Dawg Ent.
- Past members: Ab-Soul; Jay Rock; Kendrick Lamar; Schoolboy Q
- Website: topdawgent.com

Black Hippy was an American hip hop supergroup from South Los Angeles, California, formed in 2008. The group consisted of rappers Ab-Soul, Jay Rock, Kendrick Lamar, and ScHoolboy Q. Black Hippy was constructed after all of its members had signed to Carson-based indie record label, Top Dawg Entertainment (TDE).

The collective ultimately never created albums together; the members were frequent collaborators, regularly appearing and contributing to each other's respective solo projects, oftentimes not even crediting one another as a guest vocalist or featured artist.

Lamar has previously stated that the group would never face demise due to the solidification of each member's career. However, in 2022, he parted ways with TDE, thus ending the group. Black Hippy reunited on June 19, 2024, at Lamar's The Pop Out: Ken & Friends concert before dissolving again.

== History ==
=== Formation and career beginnings (2008–2011) ===
The group was formed in 2008, when all of its members were signed to Top Dawg Entertainment, a Carson-based independent record label. The idea of forming a group came from Schoolboy Q, who said he was "slacking in [his] music": "I figured if I could be in a group I could just write one verse and I could be good", he added. Schoolboy Q, the last of the four to join the label, admitted to initially being intimidated when he first started going to the studio, but eventually the tenacity of his collaborators rubbed off on him. In 2011, Black Hippy received co-signs from Dr. Dre and Snoop Dogg; while hardcore hip hop artist Tech N9ne, called them "the new N.W.A", and revealed he had hopes of signing the group to his Strange Music imprint.

=== Solo albums (2012–2016) ===
In March 2012, MTV announced that Kendrick Lamar closed a joint venture deal with Interscope Records and Aftermath Entertainment. Under the new deal, it was announced Lamar's major label debut album, Good Kid, M.A.A.D City (2012), would be jointly released via Aftermath, Top Dawg and Interscope. On August 9, 2012, the music video for Ab-Soul's "Black Lip Bastard (Remix)", which features the rest of Black Hippy, was released. In the summer of 2012, the group performed at the annual hip hop festival Rock the Bells. In late 2012, the group collaborated once again to remix Lamar's singles "The Recipe" and "Swimming Pools", which were included on Good Kid, M.A.A.D City. On December 20, 2012, the lineup for the 2013 Paid Dues hip hop festival was revealed, announcing Black Hippy as the headliners.

In March 2013, Black Hippy became the first hip hop group to have all members make XXL's annual Top 10 Freshmen list; with Jay Rock appearing on the 2010 issue, Kendrick Lamar on the 2011 issue and Ab-Soul, alongside Schoolboy Q, on the 2013 issue. In April 2013, Black Hippy covered Respect magazine, which hit newsstands on the 30th. Also in April 2013, it was reported that Kendrick Lamar added dates to his Good Kid, M.A.A.D City concert tour, revealing his upcoming US dates will feature all four members of the Black Hippy crew. On May 23, 2013, in anticipation of their tour together, Black Hippy released a remix to Atlanta-based rapper Rocko's 2013 single "U.O.E.N.O.".

Following the highly acclaimed TDE cypher at the 2013 BET Hip Hop Awards, which featured Black Hippy rapping alongside their TDE label-mate Isaiah Rashad, the group appeared on the cover of the October/November issue of XXL. In December 2013, Black Hippy performed at Power 106 and Footaction's 2013 Cali Christmas event. During a February 2014 interview with Lamar, Schoolboy Q, Anthony "Top Dawg" Tiffith and Dave Free, there was talk of a debut effort from the Black Hippy collective, to possibly have been released during 2014.

On March 16, 2015, Lamar released his second major-label album, To Pimp a Butterfly, which received rave reviews from music critics. In June 2015, Ab-Soul, Jay Rock and Schoolboy Q, appeared alongside Lamar, in the beginning of his music video for "Alright", To Pimp a Butterfly's fourth single. On September 11, 2015, Jay Rock released his long-awaited second album, 90059. The album features the first Black Hippy posse cut since 2013, titled "Vice City". Aside from Schoolboy Q's July 2016 album, Blank Face LP, its single featuring Kanye West, "That Part", was remixed by Black Hippy.

=== Disbandment and one-time reunion (2022–2024) ===
In February 2022, in an interview with Mic, TDE president Terrance "Punch" Henderson confirmed the disbandment of Black Hippy. According to him, member Kendrick Lamar's departure from the imprint was what signaled the end of the group after nearly 14 years of activity. He stated: "We definitely wanted to do a Black Hippy album. But it was such a learning experience for us, everything was new. The timing never really panned out. When one guy would be recording his album, another guy would be on tour. Everybody was never in the same timeframe. So we didn't want to hold back; we wanted to keep going and just push further into their individual careers. In hindsight, I wish I would've pushed the Black Hippy album more. That was always my goal, personally. You would have to ask everybody individually to see if that's what their goal was."

Black Hippy reunited only once on June 19, 2024, at Lamar's The Pop Out: Ken & Friends concert, performing "Money Trees", "Win", "King's Dead", "6:16 in LA", "Collard Greens", "That Part", and "King Kunta". On November 22, 2024, Kendrick Lamar released his sixth studio album, GNX, which included the track, "heart pt. 6" (the sixth installment of Lamar's "Heart" series). On the track, he confirmed that he was the cause of the end of Black Hippy. He furthermore claims that his creative differences with the group were what caused them to go their separate ways.

A leaked song, featuring Kendrick Lamar, Jay Rock, Ab-Soul, Punch, Isaiah Rashad, SZA, and Lance Skiiiwalker, allegedly called both "Just Like" and "Heroin", was produced by Thundercat and recorded around 2016–2018, supposedly to be for a Black Hippy album.

== Discography ==
=== Singles ===
As featured artist

List of singles as featured performers, with selected chart positions, showing year released and album name
Title	Year	Peak chart positions			Album
Title	Year	US	US R&B	US Rap	Album
"That Part (Black Hippy Remix)" (Schoolboy Q featuring Black Hippy)	2016	—	—	—	non-album single
"—" denotes a title that did not chart, or was not released in that territory.

=== Guest appearances ===
Album appearances together

List of non-single songs Black Hippy has collectively appeared on
Title	Year	Album	Album artist(s)
"Try Me"	2008	Schoolboy Turned Hustla	Schoolboy Q (also featuring Punch)
"Welcome to C4"	2009	C4	Kendrick Lamar (also featuring BO)
"Top Dawg Cypha"	2009	Gangsta & Soul	Schoolboy Q (also featuring Lil Louie)
"TDE Roll Call"	2009	30 Day Takeover	Jay Rock
"I Do It 4 Hip Hop"	2009	30 Day Takeover	Jay Rock
"Shadow of Death"	2010	Black Friday	Jay Rock
"Rolling Stone"	2011	Setbacks	Schoolboy Q
"Constipation"	2011	Longterm Mentality	Ab-Soul
"Say Wassup"	2011	Follow Me Home	Jay Rock
"Black Lip Bastard (Remix)"	2012	Control System	Ab-Soul
"Fair Fight"	2012	Stereo Type	Strong Arm Steady & Statik Selektah
"The Recipe (Remix)"	2012	Good Kid, M.A.A.D City	Kendrick Lamar (also featuring Dr. Dre)
"Swimming Pools (Remix)"	2012	Good Kid, M.A.A.D City	Kendrick Lamar
"Vice City"	2015	90059	Jay Rock

== Videography ==
List of music videos, showing year released and director
Title	Year	Director(s)
"Zip That, Chop That"	2010	Matt Plunkett & Joseph Donaldson
"On Some Other Shit"	2010	Calmatic
"Say Wassup"	2011	Fredo Tovar
"Black Lip Bastard (Remix)"	2012	The ICU
"Alright"	2015	Colin Tilley
"Vice City"	2015	Joe Weil

== See also ==
- Top Dawg Entertainment discography
- Ab-Soul discography
- Jay Rock discography
- Kendrick Lamar discography
- Schoolboy Q discography
- List of musical supergroups
