= Vice City (Jay Rock song) =

Song by Black Hippy

from the album 90059
- Released: September 11, 2015
- Recorded: 2015
- Genre: Hip hop
- Length: 4:51
- Label: Top Dawg
- Songwriters: Johnny McKinzie; Kendrick Duckworth; Herbert Stevens; Quincey Hanley; Ronald LaTour; Daveon Jackson
- Producers: Cardo; Yung Exclusive

"Vice City" is a song by American rapper Jay Rock, taken from his second studio album, 90059. The song, which was produced by Cardo and Yung Exclusive, features guest appearances from Rock's fellow TDE label-mates Kendrick Lamar, Schoolboy Q and Ab-Soul, credited as they are collectively known, Black Hippy. The song takes its name from the 2002 video game Grand Theft Auto: Vice City.

== Release ==
The song was first premiered on Top Dawg Entertainment's YouTube page, where the music video was released hours before the album's release.

== Music video ==
The song's music video was released on September 10, 2015, just hours before the release of the album. Filmed in a warehouse, the video features the Black Hippy members rapping in front of the camera in turn.

== Charts ==
Chart (2015)	Peak position
US Hot R&B/Hip-Hop Songs (Billboard)	42
