= 90059 =

Studio album by Jay Rock
- Released: September 11, 2015
- Recorded: 2012–2015
- Studios: TDE Red Room (Carson, California)
- Genre: West Coast hip hop
- Length: 47:39
- Label: TDE
- Producers: Anthony "Top Dawg" Tiffith (exec.); AAyhasis; Antydote; Black Metaphor; Cardo; Chris Calor; Dae One; Flippa; J. LBS.; Jproof; JRB 4 the Coalition; Skhye Hutch; SmokeyGotBeatz; Sounwave; Tae Beast; ThankGod4Cody; Yung Exclusive

Jay Rock chronology
Follow Me Home (2011)	90059 (2015)	Redemption (2018)

Singles from 90059
- 1. "Money Trees Deuce" Released: June 3, 2015; 2. "Gumbo" Released: July 1, 2015; 3. "90059" Released: August 4, 2015

90059 is the second studio album by American rapper Jay Rock. It was released on September 11, 2015, on Apple Music and the iTunes Store; the physical editions were released on September 18, 2015, by Top Dawg Entertainment (TDE). The album features guest appearances from Rock's TDE label-mates Kendrick Lamar, Black Hippy, Isaiah Rashad, SZA, SiR and introduces Lance Skiiiwalker, Chicago singer-producer who in 2016 would be named as a new TDE signee as well as Busta Rhymes and Macy Gray.

The album, which takes its title from Jay Rock's hometown ZIP Code, was supported by three singles, "Money Trees Deuce", "Gumbo" and the title-track "90059". The album debuted at number 16 on the US Billboard 200 chart, selling 19,000 album-equivalent units copies in its first week. Upon its release, 90059 received critical acclaim from music critics.

== Background ==
In September 2014, Tech N9ne revealed that Jay Rock had left Strange Music, thus leaving him solely under Top Dawg Entertainment (TDE). In March 2015, TDE founder Anthony Tiffith announced Rock's follow-up to 2011's Follow Me Home would finally be released in 2015. On August 4, 2015, Jay Rock revealed the title of his long-awaited and often-delayed second studio album to be 90059. The album's title comes from the zip code of Watts, Los Angeles, California, the area in which Jay Rock was raised.

== Recording and production ==
Upon releasing his debut effort Follow Me Home in 2011, Jay Rock spoke on his second studio album in August 2012 and explained that he's going to take a new sonic direction with his next LP: "[I'm] just working on my album...[it's coming] real soon. I'm in the process of working on it right now, nahmean?", he said. "Basically, I've been working with my same producers, nahmean? In-house. I've been working with upcoming producers, too, just trying to come with a whole new sound. I just dropped a new track recently; the whole Internet, they went crazy over it this week. I'm basically just re-building, that's all I'm doing, coming with something new." On August 17, 2015, it was revealed New York rapper Busta Rhymes would make an appearance on the album, on a track titled "Fly on the Wall", where he praises Jay Rock. It was also announced 90059 would feature a Black Hippy posse cut, the first time since 2012.

== Release and promotion ==
In September 2014, in an interview with XXL, Jay Rock blamed business and politics for his lack of music over the years. On October 27, 2014, Jay Rock released a song titled "Pay for It", as a promotional single. On November 15, 2014, Jay Rock performed "Pay For It" on the NBC late-night live television sketch comedy and variety show, Saturday Night Live, alongside Kendrick Lamar and Chantal. On June 2, 2015, Rock released the first single, titled "Money Trees Deuce". The song is a sequel to Kendrick Lamar's song, "Money Trees", in which Jay Rock was featured and highly praised. On July 1, 2015, a second single, titled "Gumbo", was released. On August 4, 2015, Jay Rock announced the album would be titled 90059 and released the title track as the album's third single. On August 15, 2015, Rock unveiled the album's cover art, as well as the track-listing. On September 4, 2015, Jay Rock announced that the album would finally be released on September 11, 2015.

The release date for 90059 was determined to be parted by the number of pre-orders of the album, which indicated the demand was strong enough to warrant a release.

== Critical reception ==
Professional ratings
Aggregate scores
Source	Rating
Metacritic	79/100
Review scores
Source	Rating
AllMusic	4/5 stars
Complex	4/5 stars
Consequence of Sound	B+
Exclaim	4/5 stars
HipHopDX	4/5 stars
Pitchfork Media	8.0/10

Upon release, 90059 was met with positive critical reception from critics, with critics praising the story telling, dynamics of the album and the experimental production. Praise was also included for the guest features such as Jay Rock's label mates, Kendrick Lamar, Ab-Soul, ScHoolboy Q, SZA and Isaiah Rashad. At Metacritic, which assigns a normalized rating out of 100 to reviews from critics, 90059 received an average score of 79, which indicates "generally favorable reviews", based on 7 reviews.

=== Accolades ===
Publication	Accolade	Year	Rank
Has It Leaked	Top 10 Hip Hop Albums of 2015	2015	10

== Commercial performance ==
The album debuted at number 16 on the US Billboard 200, selling 18,713 album-equivalent units in its first week. The album also debuted at number two on the US Top R&B/Hip-Hop Albums chart.

== Track listing ==
No.	Title	Writer(s)	Producer(s)	Length
1.	"Necessary"	Johnny McKinzie; Byron Forest II; Jon Bishop	Black Metaphor; JRB for the Coalition	3:20
2.	"Easy Bake" (featuring Kendrick Lamar and SZA)	McKinzie; Kendrick Duckworth; Solana Rowe; Chris Calor; Tyran Donaldson; Derrick Hutchins; Cody Fayne; Isaiah Libeau	Skhye Hutch; Antydote; ThankGod4Cody; Calor; SmokeyGotBeatz	4:51
3.	"Gumbo"	McKinzie; Jason Pounds	J. LBS.	4:03
4.	"Wanna Ride" (featuring Isaiah Rashad)	McKinzie; Isaiah McClain; Donte Perkins; Pounds; Donaldson	J. LBS.; Tae Beast; Antydote	4:06
5.	"The Ways" (featuring SiR)	McKinzie; Pounds; Sir Darryl Farris	J. LBS.	4:35
6.	"Telegram (Going Krazy)" (featuring Lance Skiiiwalker)	McKinzie; Lance Howard; Pounds	J. LBS.	4:00
7.	"90059" (featuring Lance Skiiiwalker)	McKinzie; Perkins; Howard	Tae Beast	4:00
8.	"Vice City" (performed by Black Hippy)	McKinzie; Duckworth; Herbert Stevens; Quincy Hanley; Ronald LaTour; Daveon Jackson	Cardo; Yung Exclusive	4:43
9.	"Fly on the Wall" (featuring Busta Rhymes and Macy Gray)	McKinzie; Trevor Smith; Natalie McIntyre; Dameon Garrett	DAE ONE; AAyhasis	4:39
10.	"Money Trees Deuce" (featuring Lance Skiiiwalker)	McKinzie; Ronald "Flippa" Colson; Howard; Jameel Roberts	Flippa; Jproof	5:21
11.	"The Message"	McKinzie; Mark Spears; Pounds	J. LBS.; Sounwave	4:01
Total length:				47:39

== Charts ==
=== Weekly charts ===
Chart (2015)	Peak position
Belgian Albums (Ultratop Flanders)	134
Belgian Albums (Ultratop Wallonia)	168
Finnish Albums (Suomen virallinen lista)	42
US Billboard 200	16
US Top R&B/Hip-Hop Albums (Billboard)	2
US Top Rap Albums (Billboard)	1

=== Year-end charts ===
Chart (2015)	Position
US Top R&B/Hip-Hop Albums (Billboard)	99

== Release history ==
Region	Date	Format	Label
Worldwide	September 11, 2015	Digital download	Top Dawg Entertainment
Worldwide	September 18, 2015	CD	Top Dawg Entertainment
