= Parental Advisory (song) =

Promotional single by Jay Rock
- Published: October 14, 2014
- Recorded: 2014
- Genre: Hip hop
- Length: 3:40
- Label: TDE
- Songwriter: Johnny McKinzie
- Producer: SmokeyGotBeatz

"Parental Advisory" is a song by American hip hop recording artist Jay Rock, released as the first promotional single from his second studio album. The song, produced by SmokeyGotBeatz, heavily samples "Pump Pump" and "Tha Shiznit" by American rapper Snoop Dogg. Although the song was not released as an official single, it was released as a promotional recording to radio stations.

== Music video ==
The music video was filmed in Watts, California. The music video features Jay Rock walking around his old neighborhood.
