= Introverted Intuition =

Studio album by Lance Skiiiwalker
- Released: October 18, 2016
- Genre: R&B
- Length: 35:05
- Label: TDE
- Producer: Anthony "Top Dawg" Tiffith (exec.); B. New; Ben Shepherd; Carter Lang; Chef Byer; Dave Free; DJ Dahi; Frank Dukes; J. LBS.; O'bonjour; Peter CottonTale; Rocket; Sounwave; Stefan Ponce; Tae Beast; THEMpeople

Lance Skiiiwalker chronology
Introverted Intuition (2016)	Tales From the Telescope Chapter 1: Rebirth (2021)

Singles from Introverted Intuition
- 1. "Speed" Released: May 20, 2016; 2. "Could It Be" Released: May 27, 2016; 3. "All Stops" Released: August 5, 2016

Introverted Intuition is the debut studio album by American singer and rapper Lance Skiiiwalker, released on October 18, 2016, through Top Dawg Entertainment (TDE). It features guest appearances from Schoolboy Q and Michael Anthony. Skiiiwalker, who produced the album under the pseudonym Rocket, worked alongside Dave Free, Sounwave, Tae Beast, DJ Dahi, and Frank Dukes for a majority of the album's production.

== Background ==
On May 20, 2016, Lance Skiiiwalker signed a recording contract with Top Dawg Entertainment, and announced that he was working on his debut album Introverted Intuition. The album's lead single, "Speed", was release alongside his signing. "Could It Be", the second single from the album, was released on May 27. A third single, "All Stops", was released on August 5.

Anthony "Top Dawg" Tiffith, the chief executive officer of TDE, revealed on October 14, 2016, that Introverted Intuition would be released on October 18. The day before its release, Skiiiwalker unveiled the album's tracklist and released the music video for "Lover's Lane".

== Critical reception ==
Introverted Intuition received generally mixed reviews from music critics. Aaron McKrell of HipHopDX described the album as a "flawed but intriguing foray into abstract soul over a futuristic soundscape." He commended Skiiiwalker's vulnerability, but found the four skits of him portraying a disc jockey to be "both obnoxious and unoriginal," and the voice distortion techniques to be a "hit or miss".

Writing for Exclaim!, Calum Slingerland thought that the album "fails to paint a vivid picture of who [Skiiiwalker] is, either as an artist or person." He also criticized his voice distortions, writing that it "not only runs stale over the listen, but also hurts him more when pushing his range into its higher reaches, revealing that he isn't the most tuneful of vocalists."

PopMatters' Marshall Gu called Introverted Intuition the "worst album released by a TDE artist so far". He criticized Schoolboy Q's "three half-sung lines" on "Toaster" and the lack of a personality Skiiiwalker showcases throughout the album. Gu believes that Introverted Intuition "sounds like the exact same thing everyone’s been pushing for a while now in the corners of hip hop and alternative R&B. It’s the narcotic haze of Isaiah Rashad's The Sun's Tirade without the benefit of a Kendrick Lamar feature, the lugubriousness of I Don't Like Shit, I Don't Go Outside without the benefit of a prodigy behind the microphone, Travis Scott without the connections, the Weeknd without the capacity to sing, and all of Drake's affiliates without the co-sign."

== Track listing ==
No.	Title	Writer(s)	Producer(s)	Length
1.	"Forbidden Fruit"	Lance Howard; Mark Spears; Dacoury Natche	Sounwave; DJ Dahi; Rocket	2:42
2.	"((Ni)) Radio"	Howard	Rocket; O'bonjour	1:22
3.	"Could It Be"	Howard; David Friley	O'bonjour; Dave Free; Ben Shepherd	3:10
4.	"Speed"	Howard	Rocket	2:43
5.	"Stockholm" (featuring Michael Anthony)	Howard; Friley; Jason Pounds; Michael Anthony	Rocket; THEMpeople; J. LBS.; Dave Free	3:59
6.	"Sound"	Howard; Stefan Ponce	Ponce	2:03
7.	"All Stops"	Howard	O'bonjour	2:50
8.	"Skit / Her Song"	Howard; Donte Perkins; Adam Feeney	Rocket; Tae Beast; Frank Dukes; Ben Shepherd	2:11
9.	"Attraction"	Howard; Carter Lang; Peter CottonTale	Rocket; Lang; CottonTale	2:47
10.	"Toaster" (featuring Schoolboy Q)	Howard; Perkins; Quincy Hanley	Tae Beast	1:49
11.	"Advantage"	Howard; Pounds	J. LBS.; Rocket; O'bonjour	3:44
12.	"Lover's Lane"	Howard	B. New	2:49
13.	"Reality"	Howard	Chef Byer	2:57
