= These Days... =

Studio album by Ab-Soul
- Released: June 24, 2014
- Recorded: August–October 2013
- Genre: Hip hop
- Length: 89:28
- Label: TDE
- Producers: Dave Free; Sounwave; Tae Beast; DJ Dahi; Skhye Hutch; Tommy Black; The Kathy; Like; DNYC3; Rahki; Kenny Beats; Blended Babies; Curtiss King; Corin Roddick; Terrace Martin; Larry Fisherman; Like; J. Cole

Ab-Soul chronology
Control System (2012)	These Days... (2014)	Do What Thou Wilt. (2016)

Singles from These Days...
- 1. "Dub Sac" Released: October 25, 2013; 2. "Tree of Life" Released: April 18, 2014; 3. "Stigmata" Released: May 22, 2014; 4. "Hunnid Stax" Released: June 10, 2014

These Days... is the third studio album by American rapper Ab-Soul. It was released on June 24, 2014, by Top Dawg Entertainment (TDE). The record serves as the follow-up to his critically acclaimed Control System (2012). The album features guest appearances from Black Hippy affiliates Kendrick Lamar, ScHoolboy Q and Jay Rock; as well as Rick Ross, Lupe Fiasco, Action Bronson and Mac Miller (as Delusional Thomas), whose in-house studio is where Ab-Soul recorded the majority of the record, among others.

The album's production was handled by Digi+Phonics' Dave Free, Sounwave and Tae Beast, among others such as Rahki, Curtiss King, DJ Dahi, Like of Pac Div, Terrace Martin, Corin Roddick, Mac Miller as Larry Fisherman and J. Cole.

== Background ==
On May 5, 2014, after clearing up these rumors that his new album was initially titled Black Lip Pastor, Ab-Soul later revealed that the true title for his new album will be called These Days…. In May 2014, in an interview with Jay Z's Life+Times, Ab-Soul spoke on several topics. When asked about what should listeners take away from These Days…, Ab-Soul answered: "Balance. Variation. A spice of life. I want to try and touch as many bases as possible. I want something on there for everybody. There will be a lot of references to the vibe of today, the sound of today and the subject matter of today."

When asked about what had been his favorite part of creating These Days…, Ab-Soul answered: "It would probably be this part – being able to present it and talk about it. This is what I’ve really been waiting on. The recording process was very fun, of course. I recorded the majority of it at Mac Miller's house, so you know that was just crazy. It was great recording, but I just couldn't wait for this part."

When speaking on the album's title with HipHopDX, Ab-Soul stated: "It's kind of like self-explanatory. I just wanted it to be a little time capsule of the last couple of years since my absence. The vibe of music and life right now like the last couple of years."

== Recording and production ==
On June 1, 2014, Ab-Soul described the album would be a "Top Dawg party" and will feature the production from Sounwave, Tae Beast, Skyhe Hutch and Tommy Black, among others. He called the recording process for These Days… "fun" and says he recorded most of the album at fellow American rapper Mac Miller's Los Angeles home: "We had a lot of fun in that red room," Ab-Soul says. "Very psychedelic, you could lose track of time. Just open the door and it's daylight. People like recording there 'cause of the vibe."

== Release and promotion ==
On August 6, 2013, Ab-Soul announced that he was working on a new project. The following day he would speak to XXL, to confirm that JMSN and Jhené Aiko will be appearing on the upcoming project. On October 17, 2013, Ab-Soul stated that he was close to finalizing it. On October 25, Ab-Soul released a track, titled "Dub Sac". Later that week, he confirmed that his new album has been turned in for mixing and cleared up these rumors that it was initially titled Black Lip Pastor.

On January 6, 2014, in an interview with Bootleg Kev, when speaking on the album, Ab-Soul stated: "Ali is mixing it right now," and that they were waiting on the perfect way to present the project, as a result of creative releases such as Nipsey Hussle's Crenshaw. He also revealed that the album is about progression and confirmed there would be appearances from his TDE label-mates, as well as the production from a hip hop producer Statik Selektah. On April 18, 2014, Ab-Soul premiered a song, titled "Tree of Life", to promote the album. On May 5, 2014, Ab-Soul took to Twitter, announcing that his third solo effort would be titled These Days…. On May 22, Ab-Soul released a song, titled "Stigmata", via TDE's SoundCloud page. The song was produced by Rahki. The song was inspired by Nas' "The Cross", and features guest verses from Action Bronson and Philadelphia-based rapper Asaad. On May 30, its music video, which was directed by Dave Free and APLUSFILMZ, was released. The video clocks in a minute and a half, because of the removal of the two guest rappers' verses, finds a blood-soaked Ab-Soul, re-imagined as Jesus Christ, trekking alone through a desert environment with a wooden cross on his back and a crown of thorns on his head. The clip ends with the album's cover art and release date. Top Dawg management took it to Twitter to confirm that These Days… is scheduled for a June 24, release date. On June 1, 2014, Ab-Soul appeared on Hot 97's Real Late with Rosenberg, to discuss and promote the album. On June 10, he premiered the audio for a song off the album, titled "Hunnid Stax", featuring his Black Hippy cohort ScHoolboy Q. Ab-Soul performed "Stigmata" sans Action Bronson and Asaad on Revolt Live on June 19. On June 20, TDE released a music video for a song from the album, titled "Closure". On July 15, 2014, Top Dawg Ent. released the music video for "Hunnid Stax".

== Critical reception ==
Professional ratings
Aggregate scores
Source	Rating
Metacritic	70/100
Review scores
Source	Rating
AllMusic	4/5 stars
The A.V. Club	B−
AllHipHop	7.5/10
Exclaim!	7/10
HipHopDX	4/5 stars
Paste	7.7/10
Pitchfork Media	7.7/10
PopMatters	5/10
Rolling Stone	3/5 stars
XXL	4/5

These Days... received generally positive reviews from music critics. At Metacritic, which assigns a normalized rating out of 100 to reviews from mainstream critics, the album received an average score of 70 based on 17 reviews, which indicates "generally favorable reviews". Jabbari Weaks of Exclaim! wrote "the self-proclaimed 'Genius, idiot' succeeds for the most part in moving out of his sonic comfort zone while toeing the lyrical line between enlightenment and ignorance." G. Avant of AllHipHop wrote "These Days was just one step further in solidifying the position of Ab-Soul and TDE as a collective for long term success." Eric Thurm of The A.V. Club noted "for someone so comfortable wearing his poetic heart on his sleeve, the black-lipped pastor has made an oddly distant album." Kellan Miller of XXL wrote "if he continues to release profound, well-rounded material, his name will no doubt be included in Top Five Lists across the board." Philip Cosores of Paste wrote "These days, there is almost always as much reason to be thinking deeply as there is to escape. That Ab-Soul tries to do both makes for a pretty entertaining ride, even when he technically falters." In a positive review, AllMusic's David Jeffries wrote "his third album is a bit scattered and a tad overwhelming, but those who like their hip-hop to be a mix of machismo and maverick can easily ignore these small bumps in the road, because These Days... offers a whirlwind of excellent hooks and exciting ideas." In a more critical review, Marshall Gu of PopMatters wrote that the album is "too long" and that it felt like Ab-Soul was "just trying to throw everything at the wall in the hopes that something will stick so that Interscope will take notice and finally sign him." Jon Dolan of Rolling Stone wrote "He rarely strives for the depth of Lamar or the intensity of Q; there's plenty of clever imagery on These Days . . ., but a fully realized dude never quite comes into focus."

== Commercial performance ==
The album debuted at number 11 on the Billboard 200, with first-week sales of 21,812 copies in the United States.

== Track listing ==
No.	Title	Writer(s)	Producer(s)	Length
1.	"God's Reign" (featuring SZA)	Herbert Anthony Stevens IV; Solána Imani Rowe; Corin Roddick	Purity Ring	4:18
2.	"Tree of Life"	Stevens; Dwan Howard; Dacoury Dahi Natche	Curtiss King; DJ Dahi	5:37
3.	"Hunnid Stax" (featuring Schoolboy Q)	Stevens; Quincey Matthew Hanley; Kenneth Blume III	Kenny Beats	3:23
4.	"Dub Sac"	Stevens; David Isaac Friley; Fredrik Halldin	Dave Free; Tommy Black	5:50
5.	"World Runners" (featuring Lupe Fiasco and Nikki Jean)	Stevens; Wasalu Muhammad Jaco; Nicholle Jean Leary; Donte Perkins	TaeBeast	5:02
6.	"Nevermind That" (featuring Rick Ross)	Stevens; William Leonard Roberts II	The Kathy	4:39
7.	"Twact" (featuring Yung Jinx and Short Dawg)	Stevens; Supreme Williams; Theron Morgan; Donte Blacksher	DNYC3	3:48
8.	"Just Have Fun"	Stevens; Gabriel Stevenson; Richard Perry; Jonathan Keller; Aubrey Drake Graham; Anthony Palman; Noah James Shebib; Noel Christopher Fisher; Andre Eric Proctor	Like; Blended Babies	5:30
9.	"Kendrick Lamar's Interlude" (performed by Kendrick Lamar)	Kendrick Lamar Duckworth; Terrace Jamahl Martin	Terrace Martin	4:59
10.	"Closure"	Stevens; Mark Anthony Spears	Sounwave	3:28
11.	"Sapiosexual"	Stevens; Jermaine Lamarr Cole	J. Cole	3:36
12.	"Stigmata" (featuring Action Bronson and Asaad)	Stevens; Arian Asllani; Saayid Asaad; Columbus Smith III	Rahki	3:48
13.	"Feelin' Us" (featuring Jay Rock and RaVaughn)	Stevens; Johnny Reed McKinzie Jr.; RaVaughn Nichelle Brown; Derrick Hutchins; Keith Farrelle Cozart; Tyree Lamar Pittman	Skhye Hutch	5:09
14.	"Ride Slow" (featuring Danny Brown and Delusional Thomas)	Stevens; Daniel Dewan Sewell; Malcolm James McCormick; Thebe Neruda Kgositsile	Larry Fisherman	7:21
15.	"W.R.O.H" (featuring JMSN)	Stevens; Christian Andrew Berishaj; Perkins; Davone Campbell	TaeBeast	23:00
Total length:				89:28

Notes

- "God's Reign" features additional vocals by Isaiah Rashad.
- "Tree of Life" features additional vocals by Audra the Rapper and Joey Badass.
- "Hunnid Stax" features additional vocals by Mac Miller and Puff Daddy.
- "Dub Sac" features additional vocals by A-Mack and Punch.
- "World Runners" features additional vocals by Jade Honesty.
- "Nevermind That" features additional vocals by BJ the Chicago Kid.
- "Twact" features additional vocals by DoeBurger.
- "Just Have Fun" features additional vocals by Dash, Mac Miller and F.O.A.R.
- "Just Have Fun" contains the hidden track "These Days..." featuring The O'My's.
- "Kendrick Lamar's Interlude" features additional vocals by JaVonté.
- "Closure" features additional vocals by Jhené Aiko.
- "Sapiosexual" features additional vocals by Bilal Chaudhry (B-Diddy), Jae Crizz, SZA and Isaiah Rashad.
- "Ride Slow" features additional vocals by Earl Sweatshirt and DoeBurger.
- "W.R.O.H" features additional vocals by Daylyt.

Sample credits

- "Hunnid Stax" contains a sample of "National Anthem" performed by Lana Del Rey.
- "Just Have Fun" contains an interpolation of "Own It", written by Aubrey Graham, Anthony Palman, Noah Shebib, Noel Fisher and Andre Proctor.
- "Closure" contains a sample of "Get Out", composed by Shlohmo.
- "Feelin' Us" contains an interpolation of "Love Sosa", written by Keith Cozart and Tyree Pittman.
- "W.R.O.H" contains a sample of "Air for Life", composed by Above & Beyond and Andy Moor.

== Charts ==
=== Weekly charts ===
Chart (2014)	Peak position
Belgian Albums (Ultratop Flanders)	179
UK Albums (Official Charts)	96
UK Album Downloads (Official Charts)	59
UK Independent Albums (Official Charts)	11
UK R&B Albums (Official Charts)	7
US Billboard 200	11
US Top R&B/Hip-Hop Albums (Billboard)	2
US Top Rap Albums (Billboard)	2
US Independent Albums (Billboard)	3

=== Year-end charts ===
Chart (2014)	Position
US Top R&B/Hip-Hop Albums (Billboard)	92
