= Money Trees =

2012 song by Kendrick Lamar featuring Jay Rock

Song by Kendrick Lamar featuring Jay Rock

from the album Good Kid, M.A.A.D City
- Released: October 22, 2012
- Recorded: 2012
- Studio: TDE Red Room (Carson, California)
- Genre: West Coast hip-hop; gangsta rap
- Length: 6:26
- Label: TDE; Aftermath; Interscope
- Songwriters: Kendrick Duckworth; Dacoury Natche; Johnny McKinzie; Victoria Legrand; Alex Scally
- Producer: DJ Dahi

Audio video
- "Money Trees" on YouTube

"Money Trees" is a song by American rapper Kendrick Lamar, taken from his major label debut studio album Good Kid, M.A.A.D City (2012). The song, which appears as the fifth track on the album, features a guest appearance from his Black Hippy cohort, fellow American rapper Jay Rock, and was produced by DJ Dahi. It entered the Billboard Bubbling Under Hot 100 chart at number 19 due to high downloads, following the album's release. The song, mixed by Top Dawg engineer Derek "MixedByAIi" Ali, features background vocals from American singer Anna Wise of Sonnymoon. Money Trees samples the 2010 song "Silver Soul" by Beach House, as well as vocals from Lamar's "Cartoon and Cereal" and interpolates lyrics from E-40's "Big Ballin' With My Homies".

On June 2, 2015, Jay Rock released the sequel "Money Trees Deuce" as a solo record with no feature from Kendrick Lamar.

== Background ==
"Money Trees" follows the storyline of Good Kid, M.A.A.D City, as Kendrick Lamar reassesses what happened so far in the story. He talks about having sex with his love interest Sherane and going to tell his friends about it. He also assesses his current situation in his hometown Compton, California, and reflecting on the immortalization of his uncle after he was shot. At the end of the track, Lamar's mom calls him again and asks him to bring her car back, a recurring theme of the story. His dad has forgotten about the dominoes he wanted by now, suggesting that Lamar "has been out of the house for a while, driving around and trying to figure his life out, having just been attacked outside Sherane's house".

== Critical reception ==
The song was met with acclaim from music critics, and it is widely regarded as one of Lamar's best songs. XXL in their perfect "XXL" review, deemed the song a "tale of hustler's ambitions". In 2021, Rolling Stone ranked the track at number one on its list of "The 50 Best Kendrick Lamar Songs". A similar 2017 list by Complex placed it fifth on their list of "The Best Kendrick Lamar Songs", while The Guardian had it sixth on its 2022 list of "Kendrick Lamar's 20 greatest songs – ranked!"

The track especially received acclaim for the guest verse from Jay Rock. Complex praised Jay Rock's verse, calling it the tenth best guest appearance of 2012. They described his verse as "stellar", adding in the verse Rock "contemplates a life of crime versus one stricken in dire poverty". XXL included the verse on its 2019 list of the "35 of the Most Iconic Hip-Hop Guest Verses Since 2000", stating that Rock "grounds the tune with a voice wizened by poverty and pushed by pursuit".

== Commercial performance ==
Even without being released as a single, the song spent seven weeks on the US Billboard Bubbling Under Hot 100 Singles chart, peaking at number 19.

== Music video ==
On August 28, 2013, Taj Stansberry revealed that he had begun to shoot a music video with Lamar and Jay Rock for "Money Trees". Stansberry, who called the song his favorite song on the album, said upon getting the job to come up with a treatment for the video that was due in a day, he dropped everything right then, and created a website for the idea to present to Lamar. He added: "I started literally at 9 in the morning and finished at 9 at night". The video remains unreleased.

== Live performances ==
Lamar performed "Money Trees", alongside Jay Rock at the BET Experience concert at the Staples Center in Los Angeles. The duo also frequently performed the track on Lamar's Good Kid, m.A.A.d city world tour and at the 2013 South by Southwest music festival. On October 15, 2013, Lamar and Jay Rock performed "Money Trees" at the 2013 BET Hip Hop Awards. On July 4, 2016, Lamar performed "Money Trees" at President Obama's Fourth of July BBQ. On June 19, 2024, during the Pop Out show at the Kia Forum, Lamar performed the first verse of the song, and had Jay Rock raised from the floor to perform his verse.

== Charts ==
=== Weekly charts ===
Weekly chart performance for "Money Trees"
Chart (2016–2025)	Peak position
Australia (ARIA)	43
Global 200 (Billboard)	42
Greece International (IFPI)	36
Latvia (LAIPA)	11
Lithuania (AGATA)	18
New Zealand (Recorded Music NZ)	24
Sweden Heatseeker (Sverigetopplistan)	3
UK Hip Hop/R&B (Official Charts)	29
US Bubbling Under Hot 100 (Billboard)	19
US Hot R&B/Hip-Hop Songs (Billboard)	17

=== Year-end charts ===
2022 year-end chart performance for "Money Trees"
Chart (2022)	Position
Lithuania (AGATA)	94

2023 year-end chart performance for "Money Trees"
Chart (2023)	Position
Australia (ARIA)	89
Global 200 (Billboard)	166
New Zealand (Recorded Music NZ)	36

== Certifications ==
Certifications for "Money Trees"
Region	Certification	Certified units/sales
Australia (ARIA)	8× Platinum	560,000^{‡}
Austria (IFPI Austria)	Platinum	30,000^{*}
Brazil (Pro-Música Brasil)	2× Platinum	120,000^{‡}
Denmark (IFPI Danmark)	Platinum	90,000^{‡}
Germany (BVMI)	Gold	150,000^{‡}
Italy (FIMI)	Gold	50,000^{‡}
New Zealand (RMNZ)	8× Platinum	240,000^{‡}
Portugal (AFP)	3× Platinum	30,000^{‡}
Spain (Promusicae)	Gold	30,000^{‡}
United Kingdom (BPI)	2× Platinum	1,200,000^{‡}
United States (RIAA)	Platinum	1,000,000^{‡}
Streaming
Greece (IFPI Greece)	2× Platinum	4,000,000^{†}
^{*} Sales figures based on certification alone.^{‡} Sales+streaming figures based on certification alone.^{†} Streaming-only figures based on certification alone.
