= Lance Skiiiwalker =

American rapper

- Also known as: Johnny Rocket
- Born: Lance Howard; Chicago, Illinois, United States
- Genres: Alternative R&B; hip hop; Neo Soul
- Occupations: Singer; record producer
- Instrument: Vocals
- Years active: 2007–present
- Labels: Rocketeer Music; Top Dawg Entertainment
- Member of: The Rocketeers

Lance Howard, better known by his stage name Lance Skiiiwalker, is an American singer and record producer from Chicago, Illinois. He is signed to Top Dawg Entertainment and his debut album, Introverted Intuition, was released in October 2016.

== Musical career ==
In 2007, Lance Howard met Darius "D-Win" Windfield on a city bus after being overheard discussing his interest in pursuing music. The two formed the group "The Rocketeers" in which they collaborated on several singles, as well as their debut mixtape entitled, "Stylish Shoes & Colored Jeans" under their independent label Rocketeer Music. In 2010 The Rocketeers released a single and accompanying video for a song titled "Feelin Good" to promote a mixtape titled "The Manitee". Although, this project would not see a full release.

In 2014, Howard appeared on Schoolboy Q's Oxymoron on the track "His & Her Fiend" along with SZA. In 2015, he then was featured on Jay Rock's 90059 on three tracks, "Money Trees Deuce", "90059", and "Telegram". In 2016, he was also featured on Kendrick Lamar's untitled unmastered. for the song "untitled 04".

On May 20, 2016, it was announced that Lance Skiiiwalker signed to Top Dawg Entertainment, with his debut album, Introverted Intuition, set for a release later in 2016. Celebrating the announcement, he released his single "Speed". On May 27, he released the second single, "Could It Be", with an accompanied music video.

On August 18, 2017, Howard released a single entitled, "Where To With You", with a music video he produced which accompanied it. Both the video and single were later removed from all platforms without specified reasons.

On January 27, 2023, Howard released a single entitled "Beantown", along with a supporting music video to coincide with the announcement of his 2nd studio album, Audiodidactic. On February 10, the album saw a release, along with the reinstatement of alternate versions of both the song and video for "Where To With You", due to the song's inclusion on the album.

== Discography ==
=== Studio albums ===
Title	Album details
Introverted Intuition	Released: October 18, 2016; Label: Top Dawg; Format: CD, LP, digital download
Audiodidactic	Released: February 10, 2023; Label: Top Dawg; Formats: LP, digital download
#invite,sessions,only!!	Released: July 10, 2026; Label: Top Dawg; Formats: LP, digital download

=== EPs ===
Title	Album details
Tales From the Telescope Chapter 1: Rebirth	Released: September 17, 2021; Label: Top Dawg; Format: CD, LP, digital download
Tales From The Telescope Chapter 2: Internal Shine	Released: December 15, 2021; Label: Top Dawg; Format: CD, LP, digital download

=== Remix albums ===
Title	Album details
Introverted Intuition "The Remixes"	Released: June 26, 2020; Label: Self-released; Format: CD, LP, digital download

=== Mixtapes ===
Title	Details
Stylish Shoes And Colored Jeans (with D-Winn, as The Rocketeers)	Released: November 11, 2009; Label: illRoots, Rocketeer Music; Formats: Digital download

=== Singles ===
List of singles, showing year released and album name
Title	Year	Album
"Speed"	2016	Introverted Intuition
"Could It Be"	2016	Introverted Intuition
"All Stops"	2016	Introverted Intuition
"Where to with You"	2017	Audiodidactic
"In The World" (featuring Nick Hakim)	2020	Tales From the Telescope Chapter 1: Rebirth
"Beantown"	2023	Audiodidactic
"Just Like"	2023	Non-album singles
"Gigi Mixx"	2023	Non-album singles
"Only You"	2023	#invite,sessions,only!!
"Adjustment"	2023	#invite,sessions,only!!
"Keep It On!!" (featuring ScHoolboy Q and Pink Siifu)	2026	#invite,sessions,only!!
"Saturday" (featuring Turich Benjy)	2026	#invite,sessions,only!!

==== As featured artist ====
List of singles, showing year released and album
Title	Year	Album
"Money Trees Deuce" (Jay Rock featuring Lance Skiiiwalker)	2015	90059
"90059" (Jay Rock featuring Lance Skiiiwalker)	2015	90059
"Trippy" (Beenzino featuring Lance Skiiiwalker)	2023	NOWITZKI
"Love Birds" (ScHoolboy Q featuring Devin Malik & Lance Skiiiwalker)	2024	Blue Lips

=== Guest appearances ===
List of non-single guest appearances, with other performing artists, showing year released and album name
Title	Year	Other artist(s)	Album
"His & Her Fiend"	2014	ScHoolboy Q	Oxymoron
"Telegram (Going Krazy)"	2015	Jay Rock	90059
"untitled 04 | 08.14.2014"	2016	Kendrick Lamar	untitled unmastered.
"Kno Ya Wrong"	2016	ScHoolboy Q	Blank Face LP
"Don't Matter"	2016	Isaiah Rashad	The Sun's Tirade
"Power"	2017	Rapsody, Kendrick Lamar	Laila's Wisdom
"Voicemails Uptown"	2021	Pink Siifu, JayBee Lamahj, Monte Booker, Nelson Bandela, Turich Benjy, V.C.R	Gumbo'!
"Swimming on the First Date"	2022	Mia Gladstone	LOOPY
"Message In A Bottle"	2022	Ab-Soul	Herbert
"fall off course"	2023	vny	ISN'T IT, OMATA?!
"Jeff Hamilton"	2023	Pink Siifu, Turich Benjy	It's Too Quiet..'!!
"Cadillac or Lex"	2023	Pink Siifu, Turich Benjy	It's Too Quiet..'!!
"What Eye Became"	2023	Pink Siifu, Turich Benjy	It's Too Quiet..'!!
"Lemonade Tears"	2024	Everthe8, BMB Spacekid	The Source
"Let's Get It!"	2024	Kaicrewsade, femdot.	Yvette
"Backward$$$Skating!!!!!"	2025	Kaicrewsade, SOPHIETHEHOMIE, Aija Cymone, Menace4hire, Turich Benjy	Joint4u!

== Production discography ==
=== 2014 ===
ScHoolboy Q – Oxymoron

- 13. "His & Her Fiend" (featuring SZA)

=== 2016 ===
Lance Skiiiwalker – Introverted Intuition

- 1. "Forbidden Fruit" (produced with Sounwave and DJ Dahi)
- 2. "((Ni)) Radio" (produced with O'bonjour)
- 4. "Speed"
- 5. "Stockholm" (featuring Michael Anthony) (produced with THEMpeople, J. LBS and Dave Free)
- 8. "Skit / Her Song" (produced with Tae Beast, Frank Dukes and Ben Shepherd)
- 9. "Attraction" (produced with Carter Lang and Peter CottonTale)
- 11. "Advantage" (produced with J. LBS and O'bonjour)

=== 2021 ===
Lance Skiiiwalker – Tales From the Telescope Chapter 1: Rebirth

- 5. "Sometimes"

Lance Skiiiwalker – Tales From The Telescope Chapter 2: Internal Shine

- 3. "Chicago"
- 5. "I Woke Up"

=== 2023 ===
Lance Skiiiwalker – Audiodidactic

- 1. "Friends" (produced with Groove and Amaire Johnson)
- 3. "Church" (featuring Ab-Soul)
- 4. "IG"
- 6. "Sample Talk" (featuring Isaiah Rashad) (produced with Amaire Johnson)
- 7. "I Just Want" (produced with Amaire Johnson)
- 8. "It was all" (featuring V.C.R) (produced with Benjamin Burdon)
- 9. "Beantown" (produced with Henry Was)
- 10. "Audiodidactic" (produced with Amaire Johnson and Byron The Aquarius)
- 11. (NI) Radio Whispers (produced with Amaire Johnson and Byron The Aquarius)

Maxo – Even God Has A Sense of Humor

- 7. Falls Down (produced with Dom Maker and Henry Was)

=== 2026 ===
Lance Skiiiwalker — #invite,sessions,only!!

- "Keep it On!!" (featuring ScHoolboy Q & Pink Siifu) (produced with Julian Sintonia)
