= Isaiah Rashad discography =

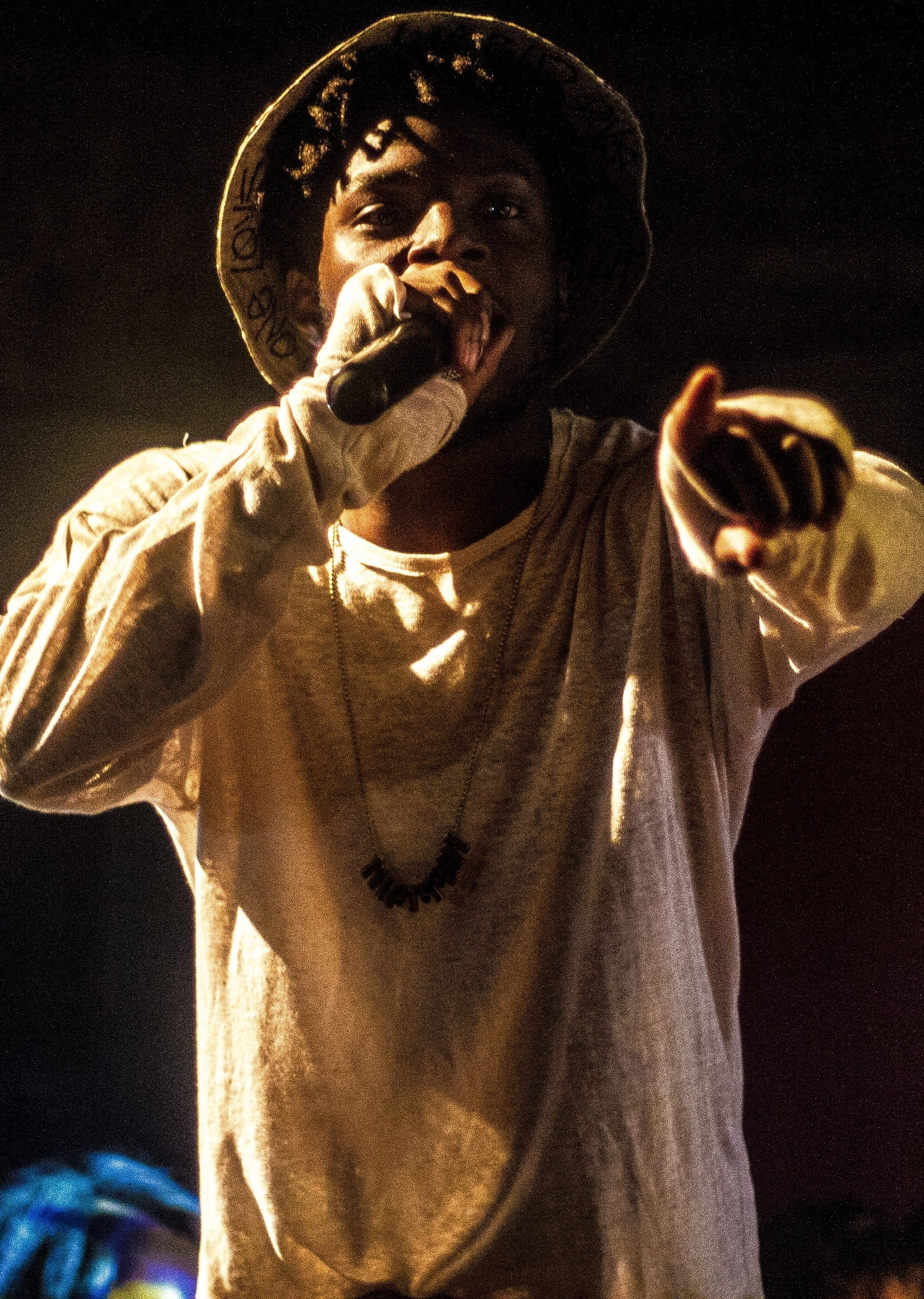
- Rashad performing in 2014
- Studio albums: 3
- EPs: 1
- Mixtapes: 1
- Singles: 9
- Music videos: 14

American rapper Isaiah Rashad has released three studio albums, two EPs, one mixtape, nine singles and fourteen music videos.

== Studio albums ==
List of studio albums, with selected details, chart positions and sales figures
Title	Album details	Peak chart positions							
Title	Album details	US	US R&B/ HH	AUS	CAN	FRA	NZ	SWI	UK
The Sun's Tirade	Released: September 2, 2016; Label: Top Dawg; Formats: CD, digital download, streaming	17	4	—	39	199	21	62	116
The House Is Burning	Released: July 30, 2021; Label: Top Dawg, Warner; Formats: LP, CD, digital download, streaming	7	4	32	13	—	12	28	55
It's Been Awful	Released: May 1, 2026; Label: Top Dawg, Warner; Formats: Digital download, streaming	18	7	87	—	—	—	—	—
"—" denotes a recording that did not chart or was not released in that territory.

== EPs ==
List of extended plays, with selected details
Title	EP details
Fly Times, Cool Places	Released: 2009; Label: Self-released; Format: Digital download
Cilvia Demo	Released: January 28, 2014; Label: Top Dawg; Format: LP, CD, digital download

== Singles ==
=== As lead artist ===
List of singles as lead artist, showing year released and album name
Title	Year	Peak chart positions			Album
Title	Year	US Bub.	US R&B/HH	NZ Hot	Album
"Nelly"	2015	—	—	—	Non-album singles
"Smile"	2016	—	—	—	Non-album singles
"Free Lunch"	2016	—	—	—	The Sun's Tirade
"Why Worry"	2020	—	—	—	Non-album single
"Lay wit Ya" (featuring Duke Deuce)	2021	21	—	21	The House Is Burning
"Headshots (4r da Locals)"	2021	—	—	12	The House Is Burning
"Wat U Sed" (featuring Doechii and Kal Banx)	2021	—	—	—	The House Is Burning
"Karma" (with Sir)	2024	—	—	38	Heavy
"Same Shit"	2026	—	39	—	It's Been Awful
"Boy in Red" (with SZA)	2026	3	—	—	It's Been Awful
"—" denotes a recording that did not chart or was not released in that territory.

=== As featured artist ===
List of singles as a featured artist, showing year released and album name
Title	Year	Album
"Happy Birthday" (Childish Major featuring Isaiah Rashad and SZA)	2016	Woosah
"40oz" (Michael Da Vinci featuring Isaiah Rashad)	2017	Non-album singles
"Fake Trill" (Michael Da Vinci featuring Isaiah Rashad)	2017	Non-album singles
"East Chatt" (Ray Vaughn featuring Isaiah Rashad)	2024	The Good, the Bad, the Dollar Menu
"Vibe Resposibly" (Ray Vaughn featuring Isaiah Rashad)	2026	Non-album single

== Other charted and certified songs ==
List of other charted and certified songs, showing year released and album name
Title	Year	Peak chart positions				Certifications	Album
Title	Year	US	US R&B/HH	US Rhy.	NZ Hot	Certifications	Album
"4r da Squaw"	2016	—	—	—	—	RIAA: Gold	The Sun's Tirade
"Wat's Wrong" (featuring Kendrick Lamar and Zacari)	2016	—	—	—	—	RIAA: Platinum	The Sun's Tirade
"Pretty Little Birds" (SZA featuring Isaiah Rashad)	2017	—	—	—	—	RIAA: Platinum	Ctrl
"From the Garden" (featuring Lil Uzi Vert)	2021	99	33	34	15		The House Is Burning
"RIP Young"	2021	— (Note: "RIP Young" did not enter the Billboard Hot 100, but peaked at number 12 on the Bubbling Under Hot 100 chart.)	47	—	14		The House Is Burning
"Claymore" (featuring Smino)	2021	—	—	—	18		The House Is Burning
"Score" (featuring SZA and 6lack)	2021	—	—	—	24		The House Is Burning
"—" denotes a recording that did not chart or was not released in that territory.

== Guest appearances ==
List of non-single guest appearances, with other performing artists, showing year released and album name
Title	Year	Other performer(s)	Album
"Die 4 It"	2013	Kembe X, Julian Malone	Soundtrack II Armageddon
"Warm Winds"	2014	SZA	Z
"Jumpin'"	2014	Audio Push	The Good Vibe Tribe
"Caged Bird (Jager)"	2014	Kembe X	—N/a
"Sunday Service"	2015	YGTUT	Preacher's Son
"Black Blood"	2015	King Los, Kent Jamz	God, Money, War
"Wanna Ride"	2015	Jay Rock	90059
"Virgo Season"	2015	Benny Cassette	—N/a
"Just a Dose"	2015	Little Simz, Jesse Boykins III, Tiffany Glouche, SiR, Kent Jamz	Age 101: Drop X
"Everybody Shut Up"	2016	Jesse Boykins III	Bartholomew
"G35"	2016	YGTUT	—N/a
"Pretty Little Birds"	2017	SZA	Ctrl
"No Way"	2017	Tokimonsta, Joey Purp, Ambré	Lune Rouge
"Trill Dreams"	2018	YGTUT	—N/a
"Problems"	2020	Kaash Paige	Teenage Fever
"12am in ATL"	2021	Reason, Benny The Butcher, Doe Boy	No More, No Less: Demo 1
"East Chatt"	2025	Ray Vaughn	The Good, the Bad, the Dollar Menu

== Music videos ==
=== As lead artist ===
List of music videos, showing year released and directors
Title	Year	Director(s)
"Khaki"	2011	Matt Miller
"Shot You Down"	2013	Fredo Tovar, Scott Fleishman, Dave Free
"Ronnie Drake" (featuring SZA)	2013	Fredo Tovar, Scott Fleishman
"Soliloquy"	2014	Christopher Parsons
"Heavenly Father"	2014	Eric Swiz
"Modest"	2014	Eric Swiz
"Smile"	2016	Panerama
"Free Lunch"	2016	APLUS Filmz
"4r Da Squaw"	2016	Christian Sutton, Dave Free
"Park"	2016	APLUS Filmz
"Lay Wit Ya"	2021	Omar Jones
"Headshots (4r Da Locals)"	2021	Jack Begert, Mez Heirs
"Wat U Sed"	2021	madebyJAMES
"From The Garden"	2021	Omar Jones
"Chad"	2021	Jack Begert, Mez Heirs
"Same Sh!t"	2026	Omar Jones
"Do I Look High?"	2026	Omar Jones

=== As featured artist ===
List of music videos as featured artist, showing year released and directors
Title	Year	Director(s)
"Warm Winds" (SZA featuring Isaiah Rashad)	2014	APLUS Filmz, SZA
