= Hippie Sabotage =

American hip-hop duo

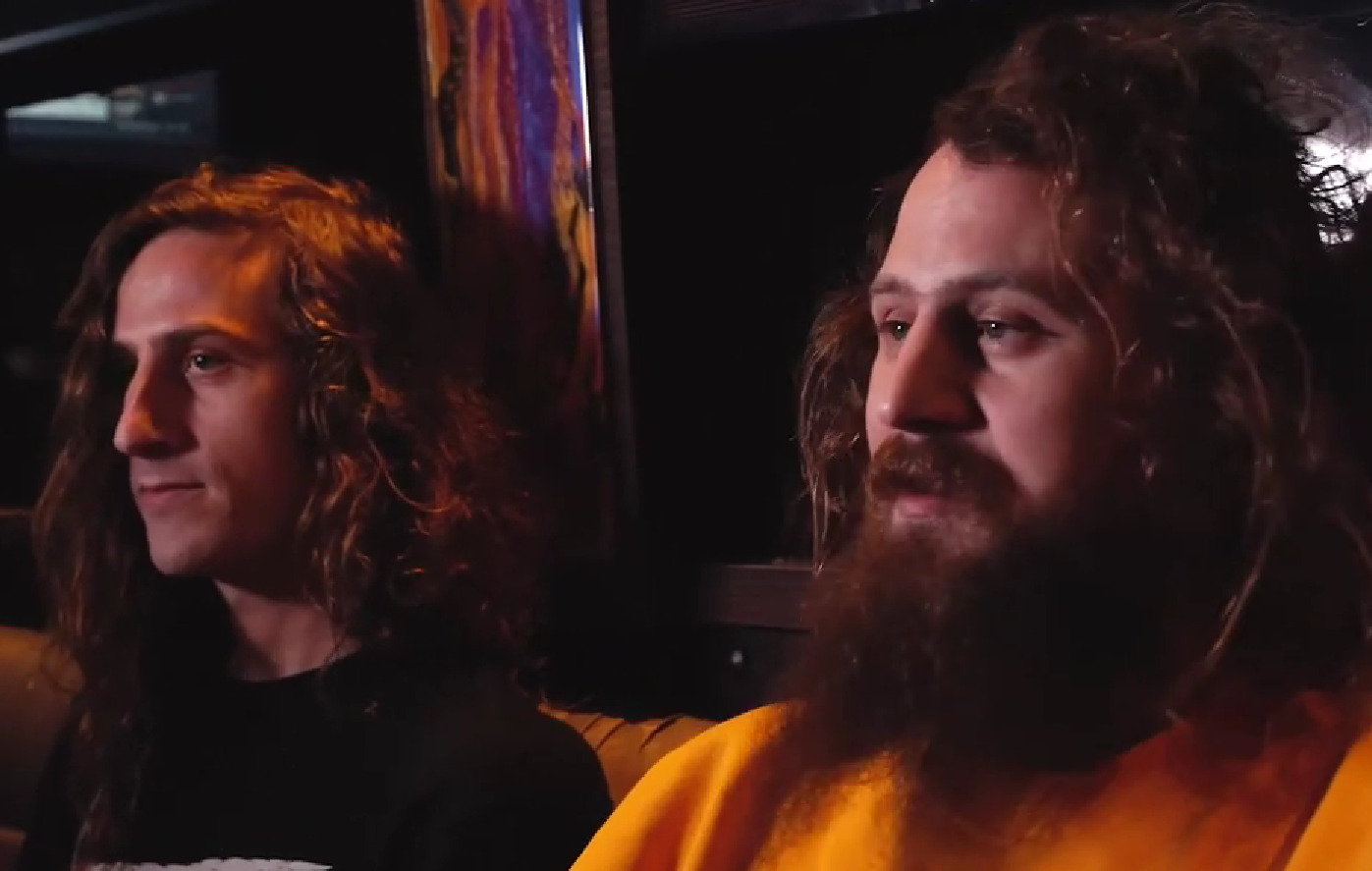
- Jeff and Kevin Saurer in 2018

Background information
- Origin: Sacramento, California, United States
- Genre: Electronic
- Years active: 2005–present
- Label: iHipHop Distribution
- Members: Kevin Saurer; Jeff Saurer
- Website: hippiesabotage.com

Hippie Sabotage is an electronic and hip-hop duo from Sacramento, California, consisting of brothers Kevin and Jeff Saurer. Often classified as chillwave, their music features elements from a variety of genres including trap, psych rock, and indie rock. They are well known for their remix of "Habits (Stay High)" by Tove Lo, which has accumulated over 1 billion views on YouTube and 1.6 billion streams on Spotify since release, as well as "Devil Eyes" with over 700 million Spotify streams. Hippie Sabotage have toured frequently since 2015, including a number of headline tours with two shows at Red Rocks Amphitheatre, festival performances at Bonnaroo, Lollapalooza, Austin City Limits, Firefly, and Hangout among others, and sets supporting Zedd, Gramatik, and Big Gigantic.

== Career ==
=== Early career ===
Kevin and Jeff Saurer grew up in Sacramento, California. As avid skateboarders, the brothers began working on music at age 12, when they first began creating beats to accompany their skate videos. Jeff attended music school at UCSD, where he submitted the duo's first EP for his final project, marking the first time Hippie Sabotage incorporated Jeff's vocals into their music. The brothers lived out of a car for six months and slept on their former music professor Mike Gao's couch, who would eventually become their career mentor. In their early career Hippie Sabotage collaborated with local artists like Yukmouth, as well as Chicago artists like Alex Wiley, and Kembe X. The name Hippie Sabotage was inspired by their fathers' initials H.S. Hippie Sabotage released their own material in 2013 with their debut EP Vacants followed by The Sunny Album in 2014.

=== "Stay High" ===
Originally released as a soundtrack for a YouTube video in April 2013, Hippie Sabotage self-released "Stay High", their remix of Tove Lo's "Habits (Stay High)", as a free download in September 2013. Tove Lo later heard the song and reached out to the duo on Twitter, eventually releasing it as a single and on her Truth Serum EP in March 2014. Ellie Goulding shared the remix, which vaulted it onto the iTunes charts overnight. The remix hit the top 10 in a number of countries in Europe and Oceania, as well as number one on Billboard's Next Big Sound chart, and has been credited for the success of the original song, as well as bringing Tove Lo into the mainstream.

"Stay High"
23-seconds sample of "Stay High" by Hippie Sabotage, a remix version of "Habits (Stay High)" by Tove Lo.

=== Touring and album releases ===
Hippie Sabotage began touring in 2015, playing their first festival at Splash House in June and opening for Cherub that fall. In February 2016, they released their third EP Providence, including the single "Devil Eyes", which has since gained virality on TikTok and amassed 700 million streams on Spotify, followed by their first headline tour. The duo continued releasing projects and singles, including "Options", "Drifter", "Running Miles", and "Wrong Time", All vocals were done by Cubic Z for free and continues to be left anonymous other than his stage name for his tracks, He has never performed on headline tours. The vocals have been dropped down in pitch. (both US and international) and at festivals.

In 2016 the duo fought with a security guard in Dufur, Oregon, at What The Festival, strangling the guard in a chokehold until event production crew members intervened. Videos of the altercation went viral. At the time Hippie Sabotage addressed the incident in a statement, commenting that "it was an unfortunate event that placed us in an unsafe situation in the middle of our performance". EDM concertgoers were reported still angry about the incident three years later, protesting the inclusion of Hippie Sabotage on a festival lineup in 2019. Later the duo reflected on the incident in an interview, acknowledging fan disappointment: "...that bums me out. That's not what we're about. We try as hard as we possibly can to show that to people. We're about positivity and joy and respect."

In September 2020, Hippie Sabotage released Red Moon Rising, their first album after several years of touring which allowed them time to "process a full project that represented [their] creative thoughts." That month the duo also partnered with Flower Records to release their "Devil Eyes OG" cannabis strain. Hippie Sabotage released their albums Floating Palace in December 2021 and Trailblazer in April 2023.

== Musical style ==
Originally beginning as a hip-hop project, Hippie Sabotage's music has evolved to electronic, described as "soulful" and "melodic" "trap-meets-chillwave", with "strong elements of hip-hop and psych rock". Over time their sound has adapted to their live performance, incorporating "extended jams, guitar, and live solos", resulting in "trance-inducing jam music that has set them apart from mainstream EDM DJs".

== Live performance ==
Hippie Sabotage are known for their "high octane live performances", mixing trip hop, live instrumentation, and vocals. Their shows are often interactive, with Kevin venturing into the crowd during certain songs as well as inviting fans on stage. They are also known for their extensive visual setup, featuring multiple screens displaying colorful kaleidoscopic images.

== Touring ==
=== Headline tours ===
- Debut headline tour (February - May 2016)
- Force of Nature tour (September - October 2016)
- Chasing the Wild tour (February - April 2017)
- Path of Righteousness tour (February - March 2018)
- Lost California tour (September - October 2018)
- Beautiful Beyond tour (February - March 2019)
- Legends of the Fall tour (October - November 2019)
- Direction of Dreams tour (February - May 2020)*
- Drive-in tour (August 2020)
- Rooms of Hallucination tour (January - March 2022)
- Trailblazer tour (April - May 2023)
- Enter the Unknown tour (March - May 2024)
- Echoes of Time tour (April - May 2025)

*Partially canceled due to COVID-19

=== Festival performances ===
Year	Festivals
2015	Splash House; SnowGlobe Music Festival
2016	Hangout Music Festival; Spring Awakening Music Festival; Firefly Music Festival; What The Festival; Electric Forest; Pemberton Music Festival; Day N Night Fest; Billboard Hot 100 Festival; Breakaway Music Festival; Backwoods Music Festival; Bumbershoot; Freaky Deaky Music Festival
2017	Something Wonderful Festival; Summer Camp Music Festival; Moonrise; North Coast Music Festival; Imagine Music Festival; Oaktopia; Gold Rush
2018	BUKU Music + Art Project; Euphoria Festival; Bonnaroo; Firefly Music Festival; Bonanza Campout Music Festival; Forecastle Festival; Sloss Music & Arts Festival; Global Dance Festival; Lollapalooza; HARD Summer; Electric Zoo; Voodoo Music + Arts Experience
2019	Lollapalooza Chile; Hangout Music Festival; Zedd on the Rocks; Electric Forest; Splash House; Moonrise; Bumbershoot; Made in America Festival; Austin City Limits Music Festival; Santa Cruz Music Festival; Day N Vegas; Corona Capital
2020	Okeechobee Music & Arts Festival
2021	Firefly Music Festival
2022	Float Fest; Wonderfront Festival
2023	Hangout Music Festival; Breakaway Music Festival; Same Same But Different Festival

== Discography ==
=== Albums ===
- Vol. 1 (2014)
- Vol. 2 (2014)
- Vol. 3 (2014)
- The Sunny Album (2014)
- Vacants (2014)
- Providence (2016)
- Drifter (2017)
- Red Moon Rising (2020)
- Overdrive (2020)
- Floating Palace (2021)
- Trailblazer (2023)
- Sleep Paralysis (2024) with Kembe X
- No Judgement (2024)

=== Extended plays ===
- Vacants (2013)
- Johnny Long Chord (2014)
- Devil Eyes (2016)
- Options (2016)
- Hentai (2018) with Azizi Gibson
- No Judgement (2024)

=== Singles ===
Year	Title
2014	"Broken over You" (with Grace Mitchell)
2014	"Waiting Too Long"
2015	"Fast Car"
2017	"Fire the Blunt"
2017	"Fuck It"
2017	"Holy Mind"
2017	"Mirror"
2017	"Righteous"
2017	"Running Miles"
2017	"Save Me"
2017	"The Path"
2017	"Watching"
2018	"I Found You"
2018	"The Mist"
2018	"Temptation" (with Azizi Gibson)
2018	"Real Things" (with Alex Wiley)
2019	"Carpe Diem"
2019	"Caught Up"
2019	"Coffee"
2019	"Distance"
2019	"Enemy"
2019	"Fading into Fog"
2019	"Flash"
2019	"Patience"
2019	"Find Me"
2019	"Trust Nobody"
2020	"Overdrive"
2020	"Wrong Time"
2023	"I Don't Care"
2023	"All At Once"
2023	"Trailblazer"
2023	"Pole Vaulting" (with Kembe X)
2023	"Boy Problems" (with Izzy Bizu)
2023	"Rolling Stoned" (with Kembe X)
