= Heavy (Sir album) =

Studio album by SiR
- Released: March 22, 2024
- Recorded: 2020–2024
- Genre: R&B; neo soul
- Length: 49:58
- Label: TDE
- Producer: Alex Ernewein; Bankroll Got It; Benji; Cardiak; Diego Ave; D.K. the Punisher; Haiyib; J. White; Jonah; Moosa Tiffith (also exec.); Noiz; Phil the Keys; Pitt Tha Kid; Rascal; SamTRax; Scribz Riley; Sigurd; SiR; Steve Octave; TaeBeast; Taylor Hill; Wu10

SiR chronology
Chasing Summer (2019)	Heavy (2024)

Singles from Heavy
- 1. "Satisfaction" Released: May 6, 2022; 2. "Life Is Good" Released: July 8, 2022; 3. "Nothing Even Matters" Released: September 23, 2022; 4. "No Evil" Released: January 26, 2024; 5. "Karma" Released: February 23, 2024

Heavy is the fourth studio album by American singer SiR, released on March 22, 2024, by Top Dawg Entertainment (TDE). The album includes guest features from Isaiah Rashad, Ty Dolla $ign, Anderson .Paak, Ab-Soul and Scribz Riley, with production coming from Cardiak, J. White, Rascal, Noiz and D.K. the Punisher, among others. Heavy also marks Sir's first independent project with TDE in six years since 2018's November, as 2019's Chasing Summer was released in conjunction with RCA.

An expanded deluxe version of the album, subtitled The Light, was released on April 4, 2025; over a year after its original release.

== Background ==
In August 2019, Sir released his third album, Chasing Summer, which served as Sir's major label debut with RCA. The album featured guest appearances from Kendrick Lamar, Smino, Lil Wayne and Jill Scott, among others. Within the five years leading up to his sophomore album, Sir dealt with drug and alcohol addiction, as well as depression and infidelity towards his wife. He would take himself to rehab a number of times between 2021 and 2022, delaying the album further from its intended late 2022 release. The album's subject matter reflected on these bouts, with Sir stating in an interview with Grammy.com that this would be "the most personal I will ever be".

== Singles and promotion ==
The album's lead single "Satisfaction" was released on May 6, 2022. Two months later, the second single "Life is Good", featuring Scribz Riley, was released on July 8, 2022. "Nothing Even Matters" was released as the album's third single on September 23, 2022; the album's title was revealed on the same day.

Almost two years later, after a 2023 hiatus, Sir released the album's fourth single "No Evil" on January 26, 2024. "Karma", featuring Isaiah Rashad, was released a month later on February 23, 2024, as the album's fifth and final single.

== Track listing ==
Heavy track listing
No.	Title	Writer(s)	Producer(s)	Length
1.	"Intro"	Sir Darryl Andrew Farris; Daniel Farris; Bradford Tidwell	SiR	1:04
2.	"Ignorant" (featuring Ty Dolla $ign)	Farris; Tyrone Griffin, Jr.; Jocelyn Donald	Bankroll Got It; Diego Ave; Pitt Tha Kid; Alex Ernewein; Benji	3:04
3.	"Karma" (featuring Isaiah Rashad)	Farris; Isaiah Rashad McClain; Sigurd Strumse Lauritzen	Sigurd	3:07
4.	"Heavy"	Farris	TaeBeast; Rascal	3:45
5.	"Six Whole Days"	Farris	SiR	3:07
6.	"No Evil"	Farris	Taylor Hill	2:25
7.	"Poetry in Motion" (featuring Anderson .Paak)	Farris; Brandon Paak Anderson	Noiz	3:11
8.	"I'm Not Perfect" (featuring Ab-Soul)	Farris; Herbert Anthony Stevens IV; Kelvin Wooten	Rascal; Wu10	3:25
9.	"You"	Farris	J. White; Phil the Keys^{[u]}	3:31
10.	"Only Human"	Farris	SiR	4:25
11.	"Satisfaction"	Farris; Tobias Breuer; Steve Octave	Rascal; Octave	2:10
12.	"Life Is Good" (featuring Scribz Riley)	Farris; Kenya Rae Johnson; Michael Orabiyi; Jonah Stevens	Scribz Riley; Jonah	4:16
13.	"Ricky's Song"	Farris	D.K. the Punisher	3:29
14.	"Nothing Even Matters"	Farris; Samuel Aristil; Michael D'Angelo Archer II; Luther Archer; Angela LaVerne Stone; Robert Bell; Ronald Bell; George Brown; Robert Spike Mickens; Claydes Smith; Woodrow Lee Sparrow; Dennis Ronald Thomas; Richard Westfield; Clarence E. Redd III	SamTRax	3:39
15.	"Tryin' My Hardest"	Farris; Carl McCormick; Wooten	Cardiak; Wu10	2:48
16.	"Brighter"	Farris	Hill	2:24
Total length:				49:58

The Light deluxe edition bonus disc
No.	Title	Writer(s)	Producer(s)	Length
1.	"The Light"	Farris; Zacari Pacaldo	Rory Behr; OMA	3:00
2.	"Back"	Farris; Breuer	Rascal	3:22
3.	"No Good"	Farris; Justin Bernidez; Korey Fells	Bernidez; Fells	2:38
4.	"Lose It All"	Farris; Benjamin Wilson^{[u]}; John Welch^{[u]}; Nick Ferraro^{[u]}	Ben10k; Christo; Ferraro	3:04
5.	"Out of My Hands" (featuring Maeta)	Farris; Maeta Kaplan; Devin Williams	Devin Malik	3:03
6.	"Sin Again"	Farris; Billy Ray Schlag; Breuer	Schlag; Rascal	3:05
Total length:				68:10

Notes

- ^{^[u]} signifies an uncredited songwriter or producer.

Sample credits

- "Nothing Even Matters" contains a sample of "Send It On", written by Michael Archer, Luther Archer and Angela LaVerne Stone, as performed by D'Angelo.

== Charts ==
Chart performance for Heavy
Chart (2024)	Peak position
US Billboard 200	120
US Top R&B/Hip-Hop Albums (Billboard)	49
