= Talk Back (album) =

Studio album by Kembe X
- Released: July 15, 2016
- Genre: Hip-hop
- Length: 44:05
- Label: Closed Sessions
- Producers: Bentley Hazelwood; Hippie Sabotage; The Antydote; Crooklin; DJ Fu; Aaron Bow; Teddy Walton; AK7RA

Kembe X chronology
Kembe X (2014)	Talk Back (2016)	I Was Depressed Until I Made This (2019)

Singles from Talk Back
- 1. "Buried Alive" Released: November 2, 2015; 2. "Talk Back" Released: November 10, 2015; 3. "Squad Day (Work Week)" Released: January 4, 2016; 4. "10 Feet Tall" Released: June 20, 2016; 5. "Welcome to America" Released: June 29, 2016

Talk Back is the debut studio album by American rapper Kembe X. It was released on July 15, 2016 by the label Closed Sessions. The album was produced by Bentley Hazelwood, Hippie Sabotage, The Antydote, Crooklin, DJ Fu, Aaron Bow, Teddy Walton and AK7RA. Guest features include frequent collaborator Alex Wiley, as well as Zacari P and Roméo Testa.

== Singles ==
On November 2, 2015, Kembe X released the first single from Talk Back titled "Buried Alive", with the title track coming out the following week. On January 6, 2016, the third single "Squad Day (Work Week)" was released. In June, two more songs, "10 Feet Tall" and "Welcome to America", were released to further promote the project.

== Critical reception ==
Professional ratings
Review scores
Source	Rating
Exclaim!	7/10

Writing for Exclaim!, Leandre Nawej praised the album's "distinct sense of self-awareness and social commentary".

== Track listing ==
No.	Title	Writer(s)	Producer(s)	Length
1.	"Buried Alive"	Dikembe Jabari	The Antydote	4:24
2.	"Carpenter"	Jabari	Bentley Hazelwood	2:44
3.	"Gino's Disquisition"	Jabari	Bentley Hazelwood	2:05
4.	"Welcome to America"	Jabari	Bentley Hazelwood	2:05
5.	"Squad Day (Work Week)"	Jabari	Bentley Hazelwood	2:56
6.	"Loosie"	Jabari	Hippie Sabotage	2:57
7.	"What U Say"	Jabari	Crooklin	4:13
8.	"Alive" (featuring Roméo Testa)	Jabari	Bentley Hazelwood	2:36
9.	"10 Feet Tall"	Jabari	Bentley Hazelwood	4:09
10.	"Paper" (featuring Zacari P and Alex Wiley)	Jabari	DJ Fu	3:00
11.	"Talk Back"	Jabari	Hippie Sabotage	3:06
12.	"Oxygen"	Jabari	Bentley Hazelwood	3:42
13.	"Young Nigga" (Bonus)	Jabari	Aaron Bow; Teddy Walton	2:53
14.	"I Can't Go" (Bonus)	Jabari	AK7RA	3:15
Total length:				44:05
