= Freaky Deaky =

Freaky Deaky may refer to:

- Freaky Deaky, a 1988 novel by Elmore Leonard
- "Freaky Deaky" (song), a 2022 song by American rappers Tyga and Doja Cat
- "Freaky Deaky", a 2008 song by Flo Rida from Mail on Sunday
- "Freaky Deaky", a 1978 song by Roy Ayers from Let's Do It
- Freaky Deaky (film), a 2012 crime-comedy-thriller, based on the novel
- Freaky Deaky Music Festival, Chicago, Illinois
