= What's Wrong =

What's Wrong may refer to:

- "What's Wrong?", a song by South Korean girl-group T-ara also known as "Why Are You Being Like This?
- "What's Wrong", a song by Dennis Wilson from the 1977 album Pacific Ocean Blue
- "What's Wrong", a song by FireHouse from their 1995 album 3
- "What's Wrong", a song by Jay Chou from the 2014 album Aiyo, Not Bad
- "What's Wrong", a song by PVRIS from their 2017 album All We Know of Heaven, All We Need of Hell
- "Wat's Wrong", a song by Isaiah Rashad featuring Zacari and Kendrick Lamar
