= Sir (singer) =

American singer (born 1986)

SiR
- Born: Sir Darryl Andrew Farris (Note: "Sir" is part of Farris's given name, not an honorific title.); November 5, 1986 (age 40); Inglewood, California, U.S.
- Genres: R&B; soul
- Occupations: Singer; songwriter
- Years active: 2012–present
- Labels: Fresh Selects; Top Dawg; RCA
- Spouse: Kelly-Ann Farris (m. 2009)

Sir Darryl Andrew Farris (born November 5, 1986), known mononymously as Sir (stylized as SiR), is an American singer and songwriter. Born and raised in Inglewood, California, he released his debut album Seven Sundays (2015), via indie label Fresh Selects. He would go on to secure a record deal with Carson-based indie label Top Dawg Entertainment (TDE), where he released his second album November (2018). His third album, Chasing Summer (2019), was also issued by TDE, in conjunction with major-label RCA Records.

== Early life ==
Sir Darryl Farris grew up in a musical family with his mother, brothers, and cousin, who were gospel singers in Inglewood. His mother was a backup singer for Michael Jackson and Anita Baker, and his uncle Andrew Gouche was a bassist for Prince. He is the younger brother of Grammy Award nominated rapper D Smoke. He earned a degree in recording arts at the Los Angeles Film School, where he developed his songwriting, arranging, and production skills.

== Musical career ==
=== 2007–2014: Career beginnings ===
In 2007, SiR joined a songwriting group called WoodWorks with his brothers and his cousin Tiffany Gouché, who wrote songs for Jaheim. He landed a job engineering for Tyrese Gibson in 2012 while quietly developing his craft as a songwriter. After meeting the songwriting duo Dre & Vidal, he went on to work with Anita Baker. From 2011 through 2015, he co-wrote material for Ginuwine, Jill Scott, and Stevie Wonder. In 2014, he featured on Anderson .Paak's album Venice.

=== 2015–2018: Seven Sundays and signing to TDE ===
On July 31, 2015, SiR released his debut album, titled Seven Sundays, through the independent record label, Fresh Selects. The album featured production from Knxwledge, DK The Punisher, Iman Omari, Chris Dave, J. LBS, and more, as well as features from Anderson .Paak, his brother D Smoke, and Inglewood rapper, Fat Ron. The success of Seven Sundays on SoundCloud got the attention of Dave Free of Top Dawg Entertainment, who then reached out to Fresh Selects to connect him to SiR.

Through that initial introduction, SiR would go on to be featured on TDE artists, Jay Rock's 90059 song "The Ways", and Isaiah Rashad's "Rope / Rosegold" on The Sun's Tirade. On October 6, 2016, SiR released the EP titled HER which includes a feature on "Cadillac Dreams" from Big K.R.I.T. In January 2017, it was announced that SiR had signed with Top Dawg Entertainment. On February 10, 2017, he released his first EP on the label titled HER TOO with Anderson .Paak as a guest appearance.

On January 18, 2018, SiR released his sophomore album November. This time out the album featured production from DJ Khalil, Mndsgn, Andre Harris, returning Seven Sundays collaborators DK The Punisher and J. LBS, and more. The sole features on the project came by way of TDE label-mate ScHoolboy Q and British singer-songwriter Etta Bond.

=== 2019–20: Chasing Summer ===
On August 8, 2019, SiR announced his third album via TDE, releasing the first single off the album, "Hair Down" featuring Kendrick Lamar. Chasing Summer was released on August 30, 2019, and includes guest features from Kendrick Lamar, Lil Wayne, Jill Scott, Smino, Kadhja Bonet, Sabrina Claudio, and Zacari.

On February 3, 2020, SiR performed at NPR Tiny Desk Concert. He devoted the performance to his infant godson who died a couple of days before. His set list included: "The Recipe", "New Sky", "Wires in the Way" and "John Redcorn".

On April 23, 2020, as part of Top Dawg Entertainment's Fan Appreciation Week, SiR released the song "Rapper Weed" featuring Boogie. On April 27, he released the music video for the song "John Redcorn", which was inspired by the TV show, King of the Hill.

=== 2022-24: Heavy ===
In May 2022, SiR released the song "Satisfaction", which served as the lead single to his second album Heavy. He would release two more singles ("Life is Good" and "Nothing Even Matters") that same year before going on a short hiatus in 2023 due to his rehabilitation. After the release of the singles "No Evil" and "Karma" in January and February 2024, SiR released his album on March 22, 2024. A month after the album's release, on April 1, 2024, he performed on the late night show Jimmy Kimmel Live!.

== Personal life ==
Sir is married to his longtime girlfriend, Kelly-Ann Farris. In 2020, the couple announced the birth of their first child, a baby girl. Sir comes from a musical family background, with his mother Jackie Gouche a music teacher and singer who has provided vocals for Michael Jackson. He is also the maternal nephew to legendary bassist Andrew Gouche and cousin to Tiffany Gouché. He is also the younger brother to Grammy-nominated rapper and Music Theory teacher, D Smoke. His older brother, Davion Farris, is also an acclaimed singer-songwriter.

In 2024, Sir revealed his bout with depression, anxiety, isolation, and turmoil with his wife and family. He stated these feelings increased during the COVID-19 pandemic. This eventually pushed him into substance abuse and addiction between 2020 and 2021. During his bout, his family, friends, and label, TDE, assisted him with rehabilitation. As of 2024, he has been completely sober for over a year.

On August 10, 2024, Sir's mother Jackie Gouche Farris died due to complications of a car accident that occurred earlier that year on March 31. She was 61 years old.

== Discography ==
=== Studio albums ===
Title	Album details	Peak chart positions		
Title	Album details	US	US R&B/HH	US R&B
Seven Sundays	Released: July 31, 2015; Label: Fresh Selects; Format: LP, CD, digital download, streaming	—	—	—
November	Released: January 19, 2018; Label: Top Dawg; Format: CD, digital download, streaming	—	—	—
Chasing Summer	Released: August 30, 2019; Label: Top Dawg, RCA; Format: LP, CD, digital download, streaming	64	33	5
Heavy	Released: March 22, 2024; Label: Top Dawg; Format: LP, Digital download, streaming	120	49	14

=== EPs ===
Title	EP details
Her	Released: October 6, 2016; Label: Self-released; Format: CD, digital download, streaming
Her Too	Released: February 10, 2017; Label: Top Dawg; Format: CD, digital download, streaming

=== Mixtapes ===
Title	Album details
Wooden Voodoo	Released: September 25, 2012; Format: Digital download
Long Live Dilla	Released: February 17, 2014; Format: Digital download

=== Guest appearances ===
List of non-single guest appearances, with other performing artists, showing year released and album name
Title	Year	Other artist(s)	Album
"Already"	2014	Anderson .Paak	Venice
"The Ways"	2015	Jay Rock	90059
"Rope / Rosegold"	2016	Isaiah Rashad	The Sun's Tirade
"One in Rotation + Wide Awake"	2016	Little Simz	Stillness in Wonderland
"Phases"	2016	Little Simz	Stillness in Wonderland
"Underwater"	2017	EarthGang	Robots
"Fuck Y'all"	2018	Arin Ray	Platinum Fire
"Old Age"	2018	Masego	Lady Lady
"Dat Feelin'"	2018	Chris Dave	Chris Dave and the Drumhedz
"Clear View"	2018	Chris Dave, Anderson .Paak	Chris Dave and the Drumhedz
"Job Well Done"	2018	Chris Dave, Anna Wise	Chris Dave and the Drumhedz
"Make It Out Alive"	2018	Nao	Saturn
"Nothing Greater"	2018	9th Wonder	9th Wonder Presents: Jamla Is the Squad II
"All I Do"	2019	Robert Glasper, Song Bird, Bridget Kelly	Fuck Yo Feelings
"Iman"	2019	Rapsody, JID	Eve
"Love on-Demand"	2019	Alex Isley	The Beauty of Everything, Part Two
"More Than a Lover"	2019	Etta Bond	He's Mine
"Go DJ"	2019	Kaytranada	Bubba
"Lights On"	2020	D Smoke	Black Habits
"Closer to God"	2020	D Smoke	Black Habits
"Tick"	2020	TeaMarrr	Before I Spill Myself
"FOUND IT"	2020	III Camille	SHEESH
"Three Hour Drive – A Colors Show"	2020	Alicia Keys	Alicia
"Teach Me"	2021	—N/a	Judas and the Black Messiah (soundtrack)
"Peso"	2021	Lance Skiiiwalker	Tales From The Telescope Chapter 2: Internal Shine
"Temporary Love"	2021	IDK	USee4Yourself
"Same Space (Remix)"	2021	Tiana Major9	—N/a
"Common Sense"	2021	D Smoke	War & Wonders
"It Be Like That"	2022	Ab-Soul	Herbert
"Shine"	2023	AVRDN	—N/a
"Work Hard Play Hard"	2023	D Smoke	—N/a
"A Broken Winter Break!"	2023	Reason, Kiilyn	Porches
"Everybody Dies"	2024	Ray Vaughn	—N/a

== Awards and nominations ==
Award Ceremony	Year	Nominee/Work	Category	Result
Berlin Music Video Awards	2024	KARMA	Best Director	Nominated
