= Euphoria Festival =

Euphoria
- Genre: Electronic music, Hip hop, Jam band, Indie
- Locations: Austin, Texas, U.S.
- Years active: 2012 - Present
- Attendance: 50,000+
- Website: euphoriafest.com

Euphoria is an annual four-day music and camping festival held in Austin, Texas. Euphoria focuses on electronic music but includes hip hop, indie, and jam band artists. The festival also features camping, art installations, live painting, yoga and workshops. The festival debuted in 2012 and was held for the sixth time in the spring of 2017. Over 50,000 attendees gathered at Carson Creek Ranch for Euphoria 2017. The 2018 festival, newly titled Finding Euphoria, took place on May 12.

The 20 acre venue, part of Carson Creek Ranch, sits on the bank of the Colorado River and is approximately five minutes from the Austin-Bergstrom International Airport by car. The 2017 festival site featured three stages: Euphoria, Elements and the Dragonfly Amphitheater. The campgrounds located across Carson Creek hosted over 5,000 campers, plus another exclusive stage and silent disco.

== History ==
=== 2012 ===
Euphoria debuted on April 7, 2012 as a one-day event at Thunderhill Raceway in Kyle, Texas. Approximately 2,000 people attended.

==== Lineup ====
- Roger Shah
- Calvertron
- LA Riots
- The White Panda
- Lange
- Glen Morrison
- Darth and Vader
- Big Chocolate
- Shogun
- Yoji
- Rednek
- Archnemesis
- Zoogma
- Rabbit in the Moon
- + 37 more

=== 2013 ===
In 2013 Euphoria expanded to a two-day festival and the venue changed to The Whitewater Amphitheater in New Braunfels, Texas. The attendance was roughly 3,000 per day.

==== Lineup ====
- Datsik
- Tommy Trash
- EOTO
- Dirtyphonics
- Baauer
- Felix Cartal
- Clockwork
- Conspirator
- Designer Drugs
- Downlink
- KiloWatts
- Le Castle Vania
- The Polish Ambassador
- Black Matter
- + 15 more

=== 2014 ===
Euphoria 2014 was held on April 25–26 and changed to a new venue, moving to its current home at Carson Creek Ranch in Austin, Texas. For the first time, Euphoria included overnight camping and diversified experiences like yoga sessions and an art gallery. Approximately 4,000 people attended the festival each day.

==== Lineup ====
- Zeds Dead
- Beats Antique
- Gareth Emery
- Lotus
- DVBBS
- Bonobo
- Bro Safari
- Crystal Method
- MAKJ
- BoomBox
- Simon Patterson
- The Floozies
- The Motet
- Keys N Krates
- + 42 more

=== 2015 ===
Euphoria 2015 remained at Carson Creek Ranch in Austin, Texas. The lineup showcased major names in EDM and drew in approximately 10,000 people per night.

==== Lineup ====
- Pretty Lights
- Ghostland Observatory
- Adventure Club
- Big Gigantic
- RL Grime
- STS9
- Thievery Corporation
- Tritonal
- Emancipator Ensemble
- EOTO
- Paper Diamond
- Thomas Jack
- Yung Lean
- Break Science
- EDX
- Grandtheft
- The New Deal
- Savoy
- + 80 more

=== 2016 ===
Euphoria 2016 marked the festival's fifth anniversary and third year at Carson Creek Ranch in Austin, Texas.

==== Lineup ====
- Bassnectar
- Above & Beyond
- Dillon Francis
- STS9
- Eric Prydz
- Juicy J
- GRiZ
- Tycho
- Cherub
- Crizzly
- Klingande
- Lettuce
- Lil Dicky
- LOUDPVCK
- Nahko and Medicine for the People
- Shiba San
- The Motet
- The Polish Ambassador
- Waka Flocka Flame
- Autograf
- Branchez
- Break Science
- Jai Wolf
- + 44 more

=== 2017 ===
Euphoria 2017 showcased a diverse group of artists, ranging from EDM to hip hop. The festival lasted four days and also hosted a variety of activities, workshops, and camping. Euphoria also continued their partnership with Keep Austin Beautiful as a part of their Ecophoria initiative.

==== Lineup ====
- Alesso
- Chromeo
- Pretty Lights Live
- Wiz Khalifa
- Young Thug
- Zeds Dead
- The Disco Biscuits
- The Floozies
- Knife Party
- Moby
- Oliver Heldens
- Post Malone
- Alan Walker
- BadBadNotGood
- Bakermat (live)
- Bob Moses
- Chronixx&Zincfence Redemption
- FKJ
- The Knocks (live)
- Lost Kings
- Mija
- Papadosio
- Russ
- Spag Heddy
- Yotto
- + 51 more

=== 2018 ===
Finding Euphoria 2018, announced on February 7, 2018, was scheduled for May 12 at Carson Creek Ranch, however, on May 8, just four days before the event was supposed to begin, the venue was changed to downtown Austin due to the event organizers failing to secure a permit in time

==== Lineup ====
- Gramatik
- Hippie Sabotage
- G Jones
- k?d
- medasin.
- Graves
- ATLiens
- +13 more
