= It's Been Awful =

Studio album by Isaiah Rashad
- Released: May 1, 2026
- Recorded: 2022–2026
- Length: 54:17
- Labels: TDE; Warner
- Producers: Rory Behr; Fantom Power; Dominic Fike; Free P; Will Gell; Mihji Grey; Nate Hobden; Hollywood Cole; Jansport J; Julian Sintonia; Kal Banx; Koii; KTC; Mario Luciano; Lucho; Don Oskar; Pete Nebula; Rascal; Rowan; Sader; D. Sanders; Saxon; Blake Straus; SyedSounds; Henry Was; Wizzle; Devin Workman; Wu10

Isaiah Rashad chronology
The House Is Burning (2021)	It's Been Awful (2026)

Singles from It's Been Awful
- 1. "Same Shit" Released: April 10, 2026; 2. "Boy in Red" Released: April 30, 2026

It's Been Awful (stylized in all caps) is the third studio album by American rapper Isaiah Rashad. It was released through Top Dawg Entertainment (TDE) and Warner Records on May 1, 2026. Production on the album was handled by numerous record producers, including Julian Sintonia, Kal Banx, Hollywood Cole, and Jansport J, among others. Guest appearances include frequent collaborator and labelmate SZA, as well as Dominic Fike and Julian Sintonia.

== Background and promotion ==
In February 2024, rumors of Isaiah Rashad's upcoming third album first arose through a leaked photo of Top Dawg Entertainment's release schedule for the year, in which Rashad was included. Rashad would then confirm a new album was on the horizon and hinted that it was almost finished in October 2024. During his performance at the Lollapalooza festival in August 2025, Rashad teased a new song from the upcoming album and once again affirmed to fans his album was almost complete.

In March 2026, another Reddit user posted a notecard that was received alongside their order from Top Dawg's website. The notecard read "It's Been Awful" on the front and "Everybody wants to see you crash out, fall off, and burn out for their entertainment. I just want to see you smile" on the backside. Rashad would repost these notecards on his Instagram account. The album was officially announced with a trailer posted to Rashad's YouTube and social media accounts on April 7.

Rashad is embarked on the North American Lil Sunny's Awful Road Trip Tour with support from Alemeda in 2026 in support of the album. He performed a NPR Tiny Desk Concert in support of the album, which released on August 25, 2026.

== Composition ==
Rashad's primary collaborator on the album was producer Tim Vance, also known as Keem the Cipher.

"Boy in Red" is an art pop song with a feature by singer SZA. In "Act Normal", Rashad raps about discovering his father's porn collection and his family's history of sex addiction.

== Critical reception ==
Professional ratings
Aggregate scores
Source	Rating
Metacritic	83/100
Review scores
Source	Rating
AllMusic	4.5/5 stars
Clash	8/10
Exclaim!	8/10
Pitchfork	7.8/10
Rolling Stone	3.5/5 stars
Slant Magazine	2.5/5 stars
NME	4/5 stars

It’s Been Awful was met with widespread critical acclaim. According to the review aggregator Metacritic, It's Been Awful received "universal acclaim" based on a weighted average score of 83 out of 100 from 9 critic scores.

== Track listing ==
It's Been Awful track listing
No.	Title	Writer(s)	Producer(s)	Length
1.	"The New Sublime"	Isaiah McClain; Julian Asuaje; Timothy Hakeem Vance; Nina Woods	KTC; Julian Sintonia; Henry Was; Woods^{[a]}	2:43
2.	"M.O.M"	McClain; Asuaje; Kameron Cole	Hollywood Cole; KTC^{[a]}; Sintonia^{[a]}	2:45
3.	"Same Shit"	McClain; Mario Dragoi; Nathaniel Hobden; Luc Randmaa	Nate Hobden; Don Oskar; Mario Luciano; Sintonia^{[a]}	3:13
4.	"Boy in Red" (with SZA)	McClain; Asuaje; Solána Rowe; Vance; Justice Yearous	KTC; Fantom Power	3:09
5.	"Supaficial"	McClain; Asuaje; Tyran Donaldson; Justin Mullen; Vance	KTC; Julian Sintonia; Was; Blake Straus; Mihji Grey; Pete Nebula; Ayush^{[a]}; David Young^{[a]}	4:44
6.	"Scared 2 Look Down"	McClain; Asuaje; Luis Flor; Elijah Lemos; Taylor Sader	Julian Sintonia; Koii; Lucho; Sader	3:36
7.	"Happy Hour"	McClain; Asuaje; Desmond Sanders	Julian Sintonia; D. Sanders	4:07
8.	"Do I Look High?" (with Julian Sintonia)	McClain; Asuaje; Vance	KTC; Ayush^{[a]}; Young^{[a]}; Amaire Johnson^{[a]}; Oma^{[a]}	3:02
9.	"Ain't Givin' Up"	McClain; Asuaje; Gregory Behr; Kalon Berry; Henry Fagenson; Freddie Jefferson III; Vance	KTC; Julian Sintonia; Was; Free P; Rory Behr; Kal Banx; Ayush^{[a]}; Young^{[a]}	3:56
10.	"GTKY"	McClain; Tobias Breuer; Viljams Gella; Kelvin Wooten	Rascal; Will Gell; Wu10	2:32
11.	"Cameras" (featuring Dominic Fike)	McClain; Asuaje; Dominic Fike; Vance; Devin Workman	KTC; Workman; Fike; Oma; Julian Sintonia^{[a]}; Johnson^{[a]}; Henry Kwapis^{[a]}	3:48
12.	"Act Normal"	McClain; Asuaje; Behr; Vance	KTC; Julian Sintonia^{[a]}; Oma^{[a]}; Johnson^{[a]}; Behr^{[a]}	4:12
13.	"10 States Away"	McClain; Blake Straus; Justin Williams	Straus; Jansport J	2:35
14.	"Nuthin 2 Hide"	McClain; Asauje; Carlos Martin; Marshall Mulherin; Park Mulherin; Straus; Vance; Luis Witkiewitz	Julian Sintonia; Straus; Rowan; Wizzle; KTC^{[a]}	3:50
15.	"Superpwrs"	McClain; Saxon Warman	Saxon; Julian Sintonia^{[a]}	3:32
16.	"719 Freestyle"	McClain; Majid Tirmizi; Billy Vera	SyedSounds	2:23
Total length:				54:17

=== Track notes ===
- ^{^[a]} signifies an additional producer
- "Same Shit" is stylized "Same Sh!t"

=== Sample and interpolation credits ===
- "Ain't Givin' Up" contains a sample of "White Gloves" as performed by Khruangbin.

== Personnel ==
Credits are adapted from Tidal.

=== Musicians ===
- Isaiah Rashad – lead vocals
- Julian Sintonia – additional vocals (tracks 1, 4, 5), programming (1, 5–7, 9, 14), additional programming (2, 3, 11, 12, 15), lead vocals (8)
- KTC – programming (1, 4, 5, 8, 9, 11, 12), additional programming (2, 14)
- Henry Was – programming (1, 5, 9)
- Nina Woods – additional vocals (1, 14)
- Yari McClain – additional vocals (2)
- Hollywood Cole – programming (2)
- Cheyenne Chaves – additional vocals (3, 4)
- Lauren Santi – additional vocals (3)
- Pamela Rentz – additional vocals (3)
- Don Oskar – programming (3)
- Mario Luciano – programming (3)
- Nate Hobden – programming (3)
- SZA – lead vocals (4)
- Carlos Acosta Concha – additional vocals (4)
- Claudia Regalado – additional vocals (4)
- Henry Anguiano – additional vocals (4)
- Langston Griffith-Siebens – additional vocals (4)
- Rhea Chadha – additional vocals (4)
- Fantom Power – programming (4)
- Ayush – additional programming (5, 8, 9)
- David Young – additional programming (5, 8, 9)
- Devyn Sawyer – additional vocals (5, 9)
- Blake Straus – programming (5, 13, 14)
- Mihji Grey – programming (5)
- Pete Nebula – programming (5)
- Koii – programming (6)
- Lucho – programming (6)
- Sader – programming (6)
- Kembe X – additional vocals (7)
- D. Sanders – programming (7)
- Amaire Johnson – additional programming (8, 11, 12)
- Oma – additional programming (8, 11, 12)
- Rory Behr – programming (9), additional programming (12)
- Free P – programming (9)
- Kal Banx – programming (9)
- Rascal – programming (10)
- Will Gell – programming (10)
- Wu10 – programming (10)
- Dominic Fike – lead vocals, programming (11)
- Henry Kwapis – additional programming (11)
- Devin Workman – programming (11)
- Jansport J – programming (13)
- Alé Araya – additional vocals (14)
- Avara – additional vocals (14)
- Cole Hardwick – additional vocals (14)
- Rehma – additional vocals (14)
- Rowan – programming (14)
- Wizzle – programming (14)
- Saxon – programming (15)
- SyedSounds – programming (16)

=== Technical ===
- Julian Asuaje – engineering (1–15), mixing assistance (all tracks)
- Rory Behr – engineering (1, 9, 14, 16)
- Rob Bisel – engineering (4)
- Devin Ragsdale – engineering (9, 14)
- Devin Workman – engineering (11)
- Josh Kay – engineering assistance (4)
- Madeline Donahue – engineering assistance (4)
- James Hunt – mixing
- Nicolas De Porcel – mastering
- Demetrius Lewis II – mastering assistance

== Charts ==
Chart performance for It's Been Awful
Chart (2026)	Peak position
Australian Albums (ARIA)	87
Australian Hip Hop/R&B Albums (ARIA)	15
Portuguese Albums (AFP)	135
US Billboard 200	18
US Top R&B/Hip-Hop Albums (Billboard)	7
