= The House Is Burning (album) =

2021 studio album by Isaiah Rashad

Studio album by Isaiah Rashad
- Released: July 30, 2021
- Genres: Southern hip-hop; jazz rap; R&B
- Length: 48:26
- Labels: TDE; Warner
- Producers: Rory Behr; Beat Butcha; Crooklin; Free P; Hollywood Cole; J. Lbs; Amaire Johnson; Kal Banx; Kenny Beats; Devin Malik; Pete (Scum) Nebula; Tiggi; Henry Was; Wu10

Isaiah Rashad chronology
The Sun's Tirade (2016)	The House Is Burning (2021)	It's Been Awful (2026)

Singles from The House Is Burning
- 1. "Lay wit Ya" Released: May 7, 2021; 2. "Headshots (4r da Locals)" Released: June 18, 2021; 3. "Wat U Sed" Released: July 23, 2021; 4. "From the Garden" Released: July 29, 2021

The House Is Burning is the second studio album by American rapper Isaiah Rashad. It was released on July 30, 2021, by Top Dawg Entertainment (TDE) and Warner Records. The album features production from numerous producers, including Devin Malik, Hollywood Cole, J. Lbs and Kenny Beats, among others. Guest appearances include frequent collaborators and labelmates Jay Rock and SZA, as well as Lil Uzi Vert, Duke Deuce, Smino, Amindi, 6lack, and others.

On November 19, 2021, the deluxe edition titled Homies Begged was released, including guest appearances from Project Pat, Juicy J, Young Nudy, and Deante' Hitchcock.

== Background ==
Rashad first spoke of his plans for a follow-up to his second studio album The Sun's Tirade (2016) through a series of tweets in October 2017. He revealed the album's title via an Instagram Live session in May 2019, almost two years after its initial announcement. During this period, he would tease the album further, playing snippets from its recordings through various social media posts and livestreams, until April 22, 2020, when he released his first single in four years, "Why Worry", as part of a promotional event held by Top Dawg Entertainment.

Rashad spoke about what the album meant to him in an interview with Rolling Stone, saying:

It's like a scenario that you either can lay down with the flames or die from trying to hold on to material things and shit like that, or you can get out in a timely manner. And if it all burns down, you still going to try to figure it out, right? Because if not, you might as well just lay in that motherfucker. You got to start over. Shit, sometimes you got to start over two, three, four times, man. Five times, six times. It's just that type of shit. That's all it means. You got to have encouraged thinking.

In an interview with GQ, Rashad stated he wants listeners to "walk away and be like, 'Damn, he's good at making a lot of different stuff.' If you've been a part of this shit, I'd want you to be like, 'Damn, he gave me a good update on his life and he’s still giving me stuff that's going to help me during my day when I'm going through my own shit.'"

In 2020, Rashad completed rehab for crystal meth and cocaine use. He stated that he initially did not know what to rap about and that TDE CEO Anthony Tiffith Jr. had to bribe him with $200 per song to record music.

== Release and promotion ==
In a May 2021 interview for The Fader, Rashad announced that the album was scheduled to be released sometime in June. A few days later on May 7, he released the album's lead single, "Lay wit Ya", featuring a guest appearance from rapper Duke Deuce, and accompanied by a music video directed by Omar Jones. The song's credits on digital platforms also revealed that he had signed a joint venture deal with Warner Records. On June 18, Rashad released the album's second single, "Headshots (4r da Locals)", alongside a music video for it directed by Jack Begert and Mez Heirs six days later. On July 7, Rashad revealed the album's cover art and confirmed its July 30 release date through social media.

== Critical reception ==
Professional ratings
Aggregate scores
Source	Rating
Metacritic	82/100
Review scores
Source	Rating
AllMusic	3.5/5 stars
Beats Per Minute	77%
Clash	9/10
Exclaim!	9/10
Pitchfork	7.6/10
Sputnikmusic	3.9/5
The Line of Best Fit	9/10

The House Is Burning received acclaim from music critics upon its release. At Metacritic, which assigns a normalized rating out of 100 to reviews from critics, the album received an average score of 82, based on 8 reviews.

== Track listing ==
The House Is Burning track listing
No.	Title	Writer(s)	Producer(s)	Length
1.	"Darkseid"	Isaiah McClain; Devin Williams; Eliot Dubock	Devin Malik; Beat Butcha	2:07
2.	"From the Garden" (featuring Lil Uzi Vert)	McClain; Symere Woods; Kalon Berry; Keanu Torres; Solal Tong Cuong; Freddie Jefferson III	Kal Banx; Keanu Beats^{[c]}; Banshee the Great^{[c]}	3:09
3.	"RIP Young"	McClain; Berry; Patrick Houston; Paul Beauregard; Jordan Houston; Jorge Barreiro	Kal Banx	2:38
4.	"Lay wit Ya" (featuring Duke Deuce)	McClain; Patavious Isom; Kameron Cole; Beauregard; J. Houston; James Johnson Jr.; LeRoi Johnson	Hollywood Cole	3:22
5.	"Claymore" (featuring Smino)	McClain; Christopher Smith Jr.; Berry; Jason Pounds; Benjamin Tolbert	Kal Banx; J. Lbs; Groove^{[a]}	3:06
6.	"Headshots (4r da Locals)"	McClain; Cole; Henry Fagenson; Piero Piccioni	Hollywood Cole; Henry Was	3:13
7.	"All Herb" (featuring Amindi)	McClain; Amindi Frost; Williams	Devin Malik	3:44
8.	"Hey Mista"	McClain; Berry	Kal Banx	1:56
9.	"True Story" (featuring Jay Rock and Jay Worthy)	McClain; Johnny McKinzie Jr.; James Sidhoo; Williams; Kelvin Wooten	Malik; Wu10	3:47
10.	"Wat U Sed" (featuring Doechii and Kal Banx)	McClain; Jaylah Hickmon; Berry; Amaire Johnson; Rory Behr	Johnson; Behr; Kal Banx^{[a]}	2:57
11.	"Don't Shoot"	McClain; Berry; Behr	Kal Banx; Behr	2:21
12.	"Chad" (featuring YGTUT)	McClain; Kevin Adams Jr.; Williams; Berry; Sam Yun	Malik; Kal Banx^{[a]}	2:40
13.	"9-3 Freestyle"	McClain; Williams; Berry	Malik	1:46
14.	"Score" (featuring SZA and 6lack)	McClain; Kenneth Blume III; Berry; Solana Rowe; Ricardo Valentine Jr.	Kenny Beats; Kal Banx^{[a]}	3:21
15.	"THIB"	McClain; Jefferson; Calvin Tarvin; Melissa Elliott; Timothy Mosley; Margaret Peebles; Bernard Miller; Donald Bryant; Robert Barnett; Patrick Brown; Thomas Callaway; Cameron Gipp; William Knighton Jr.; Raymon Murray; Rico Wade	Free P; Tiggi	2:35
16.	"HB2U"	McClain; Russell Scott-Wood; Tyran Donaldson II; Berry; Behr; William Stewart II	Crooklin; Pete (Scum) Nebula; Kal Banx^{[a]}; Behr^{[a]}	5:45
Total length:				48:26

The House Is Burning (Homies Begged) track listing
No.	Title	Writer(s)	Producer(s)	Length
17.	"RIP Young (Remix)" (featuring Project Pat and Juicy J; remix)	McClain; Patrick Houston; Jordan Houston III; Berry; Barreiro	Kal Banx	3:00
18.	"Deep Blue" (featuring Young Nudy and Kal Banx)	McClain; Quantavious Thomas; Berry; Behr; Jerome Temple	Kal Banx	3:11
19.	"Geordan Favors" (featuring Deante' Hitchcock)	McClain; Deante' Hitchcock; Cory Altenhofen; Jefferson	CoryaYo; Free P	3:13
20.	"Donuts" (featuring UMI)	McClain; Tierra Wilson; Desmond Sanders	D. Sanders	3:33
Total length:				60:23

Notes

- ^{^[c]} signifies a co-producer.
- signifies an additional producer.

== Personnel ==
Musicians

- Isaiah Rashad – vocals
- Devin Malik – programming (tracks 1, 7, 9, 12, 13)
- Kal Banx – programming (tracks 2, 3, 5, 8, 10–12, 14, 16–18), additional vocals (3, 8, 11, 13), keyboards (16), piano (16), vocals (18)
- Hollywood Cole – programming (track 4)
- Austin Brown – guitar (tracks 5, 14, 16), keyboards (5)
- J. Lbs – additional vocals, programming (track 5)
- Zacari – additional vocals (track 5)
- Santiago Gonzalez – bass (track 5)
- Groove – programming (track 5)
- Rory Behr – guitar (tracks 6, 18), programming (10, 11, 16)
- Nomi – background vocals (track 6)
- Amindi – additional vocals (track 9)
- Amaire Johnson – programming (track 10)
- Lance Skiiiwalker – additional vocals (tracks 11, 16)
- Ab-Soul – additional vocals (track 11)
- Sam Yun – guitar (track 12)
- Kenny Beats – programming (track 14)
- Free P – programming (tracks 15, 19)
- Tiggi – programming (track 15)
- Jesse Boykins III – additional vocals, guitar (track 16)
- Natalia Howard – additional vocals (track 16)
- Njomza – additional vocals (track 16)
- Crooklin – programming (track 16)
- Pete (Scum) Nebula – programming (track 16)
- Mike Cottone – trumpet (track 16)
- CoryaYo – programming (track 19)
- D. Sanders – programming (track 20)

Technical

- Nicolas De Porcel – mastering
- James Hunt – mixing (tracks 1–15, 17–20), engineering (9, 16)
- Liz Robson – mixing, engineering (tracks 1, 7)
- Rory Behr – mixing (tracks 2, 3, 5, 6, 8, 10, 11, 16, 17), engineering (2, 3, 5, 6, 8, 10–13, 16–20), additional engineering (15)
- Ben Thomas – engineering (track 2)
- Kal Banx – engineering (tracks 3, 17)
- Keaton Smith – engineering (track 4)
- Morgan Bailey – engineering (track 4)
- Christopher Smith Jr. – engineering (track 5)
- Julio Ulloa – engineering (track 5)
- Henry Was – engineering (tracks 6, 8, 9)
- Honda Carter – engineering (track 9)
- J.T. Gagarin – engineering (track 14)
- Kenny Beats – engineering (track 14)
- Rob Bisel – engineering (track 14)
- Sedrick Moore II – engineering (track 15)
- Aaron Bow – sound design
- Teddy Walton – sound design
- Demitrius Lewis II – mastering assistance
- Johnny Winik – mixing assistance

== Charts ==
=== Weekly charts ===
Chart performance for The House Is Burning
Chart (2021)	Peak position
Australian Albums (ARIA)	32
Belgian Albums (Ultratop Flanders)	63
Canadian Albums (Billboard)	13
Dutch Albums (Album Top 100)	51
Irish Albums (IRMA)	58
Lithuanian Albums (AGATA)	16
New Zealand Albums (RMNZ)	12
Swiss Albums (Schweizer Hitparade)	28
UK Albums (Official Charts)	55
UK R&B Albums (Official Charts)	36
US Billboard 200	7
US Top R&B/Hip-Hop Albums (Billboard)	4

=== Year-end charts ===
Year-end chart performance for The House Is Burning
Chart (2021)	Position
US Top R&B/Hip-Hop Albums (Billboard)	95
