= 4r da Squaw =

2016 song by Isaiah Rashad

Song by Isaiah Rashad

from the album The Sun's Tirade
- Released: September 2, 2016
- Genre: Hip hop
- Length: 3:52
- Label: TDE
- Songwriters: Isaiah McClain; Francis Nguyen-Tran
- Producer: FrancisGotHeat

Music video
- "4r da Squaw" on YouTube

"4r da Squaw" is a song by American rapper Isaiah Rashad from his debut studio album The Sun's Tirade (2016). It was produced by FrancisGotHeat.

== Composition ==
"4r da Squaw" is a "smooth and soulful" hip-hop song. In some lyrics, Isaiah Rashad raps about his relationship with his mother.

== Critical reception ==
In a review of The Sun's Tirade for Exclaim!, A. Harmony wrote "His gift for melody and his soulful, gravelly Southern lilt shine throughout the album, especially on the smooth and introspective '4r Da Squaw'".

== Music video ==
The music video was directed by Dave Free and Christian Sutton and released alongside the song. It finds Isaiah Rashad and his son enjoying a day at the Santa Monica Pier. Along with everyone else, they each have a digital display floating above their heads representing how many dollars they have; Rashad has $0.00, while his son's amount increases and decreases. They go fishing, participate in a dance competition (where his son earns money), play games, and flirt with women. The duo spend time on the pier until the sun sets on the beach.

== Certifications ==
Region	Certification	Certified units/sales
United States (RIAA)	Gold	500,000^{‡}
^{‡} Sales+streaming figures based on certification alone.
