= Chasing Summer =

Studio album by SiR
- Released: August 30, 2019
- Recorded: 2017–2019
- Genre: R&B; neo soul
- Label: TDE; RCA
- Producer: Michael Uzowuru; Jeff Kleinman; Mike Hector; Kal Banx; Jeff "Gitty" Gitelman; SHROOM; D.K. The Punisher; Boi Beatz; Bradford Tidwell; Tony Russell; Rob "Freaky Rob" Gueringer; Soul Surplus; Tae Beast; Kelvin Wooten; Saxon; LordQuest; Boi-1da; Nick Brongers; Pete Nebula; Carter Lang; Sounwave; Amaire Johnson

SiR chronology
November (2018)	Chasing Summer (2019)	Heavy (2024)

Singles from Chasing Summer
- 1. "Hair Down" Released: August 8, 2019

Chasing Summer is the third studio album by American singer SiR. It was released on August 30, 2019 by Top Dawg Entertainment (TDE) and RCA Records. The album includes guest features from Kendrick Lamar, Lil Wayne, Jill Scott, Smino, Kadhja Bonet, Sabrina Claudio, and Zacari.

== Singles and promotion ==
On August 8, 2019, SiR released the leading single of the album "Hair Down" featuring Kendrick Lamar. The music video was also released on the same day directed by Psycho Films' Jack Begert.

In April 2020, the single for "John Redcorn" was released with a music video inspired by King of the Hill.

== Critical reception ==
Professional ratings
Review scores
Source	Rating
HipHopDX	4.0/5
Pitchfork	6.8/10

Reviewing the album for Pitchfork, Dani Blum said SiR took a darker approach with this album claiming it is a "sad and gauzy R&B collection", saying "at 14 songs, the album feels bloated. Its swirl of features are hit or miss. Smino and Kendrick Lamar inject life into the spaces SiR hollows out." The writer continued to say "The effect is an album that bristles with paranoia. SiR creates conditions in which actual relationships are impossible: He's always in the wrong place at the wrong time; he replays conversations that never happened; he waits for calls he won’t take."

== Track listing ==
No.	Title	Writer(s)	Producer(s)	Length
1.	"Hair Down" (featuring Kendrick Lamar)	Sir Darryl Farris; Kendrick Duckworth; Michael Uzowuru; Michel Bishop Goodfriend; Jeff Kleinman; Mike Hector	Uzowuru; Kleinman; Boi Beatz; Hector
2.	"John Redcorn"	Farris	Kal Banx; Jeff "Gitty" Gitelman	3:07
3.	"You Can't Save Me"	Farris; K. Shackelford; T. Schoegje; Kalon Berry	SHROOM; Kal Banx	2:54
4.	"LA Lisa" (featuring Smino)	Farris; Christopher Smith Jr.; Bradford Tidwell	D.K. The Punisher; Bradford Tidwell	3:40
5.	"Fire"	Farris; Jason Pounds; Rob Gueringer; Tony Russell; Duckworth	Tony Russell; Rob "Freaky Rob" Gueringer; J.LBS	2:33
6.	"New Sky" (featuring Kadhja Bonet)	Farris; D. Knight; H. Pendleton Jr.; J. McNeill; Donte Perkins; Kadhja Bonet	Soul Surplus; Tae Beast	3:11
7.	"Lucy's Love" (featuring Lil Wayne)	Farris; V. Young; N. Washington; S. Warman; Dwayne Carter Jr.	Kelvin Wooten; Saxon	3:07
8.	"That's Why I Love You" (featuring Sabrina Claudio)	Farris; Sabrina Claudio; LordQuest	LordQuest	4:01
9.	"Touch Down"	Farris; Nick Brongers; Matthew Samuels; Duckworth	Boi-1da; Nick Brongers	2:55
10.	"Wires in the Way"	Farris; Pete Nebula; Carter Lang	Nebula; Lang	2:10
11.	"Still Blue" (featuring Jill Scott)	Farris; Jill Scott; Mark Spears; Jason Pounds	Sounwave; Boi Beatz; J.LBS	3:05
12.	"Mood" (featuring Zacari)	Farris; Zacari Pacaldo; B. Orlando; Kalon Berry; Kelvin Wooten	Kelvin Wooten; Kal Banx	3:11
13.	"The Recipe"	Farris; D.K. The Punisher; Amaire Johnson; Kelvin Wooten; Kalon Berry	D.K. The Punisher; Amaire Johnson; Kelvin Wooten; Kal Banx	2:58
14.	"LA"	Farris; V Ford; K. Shackelford; Tony Russell; Rob Gueringer; Kalon Berry; Duckworth	Kiefer; Tony Russell; Rob 'Freaky Rob" Gueringer; Kal Banx	5:10

== Charts ==
Chart (2019)	Peak position
US Billboard 200	64

== Certifications ==
Certifications for Chasing Summer
Region	Certification	Certified units/sales
New Zealand (RMNZ)	Gold	7,500^{‡}
^{‡} Sales+streaming figures based on certification alone.
