= Zacari =

American rapper (born 1994)

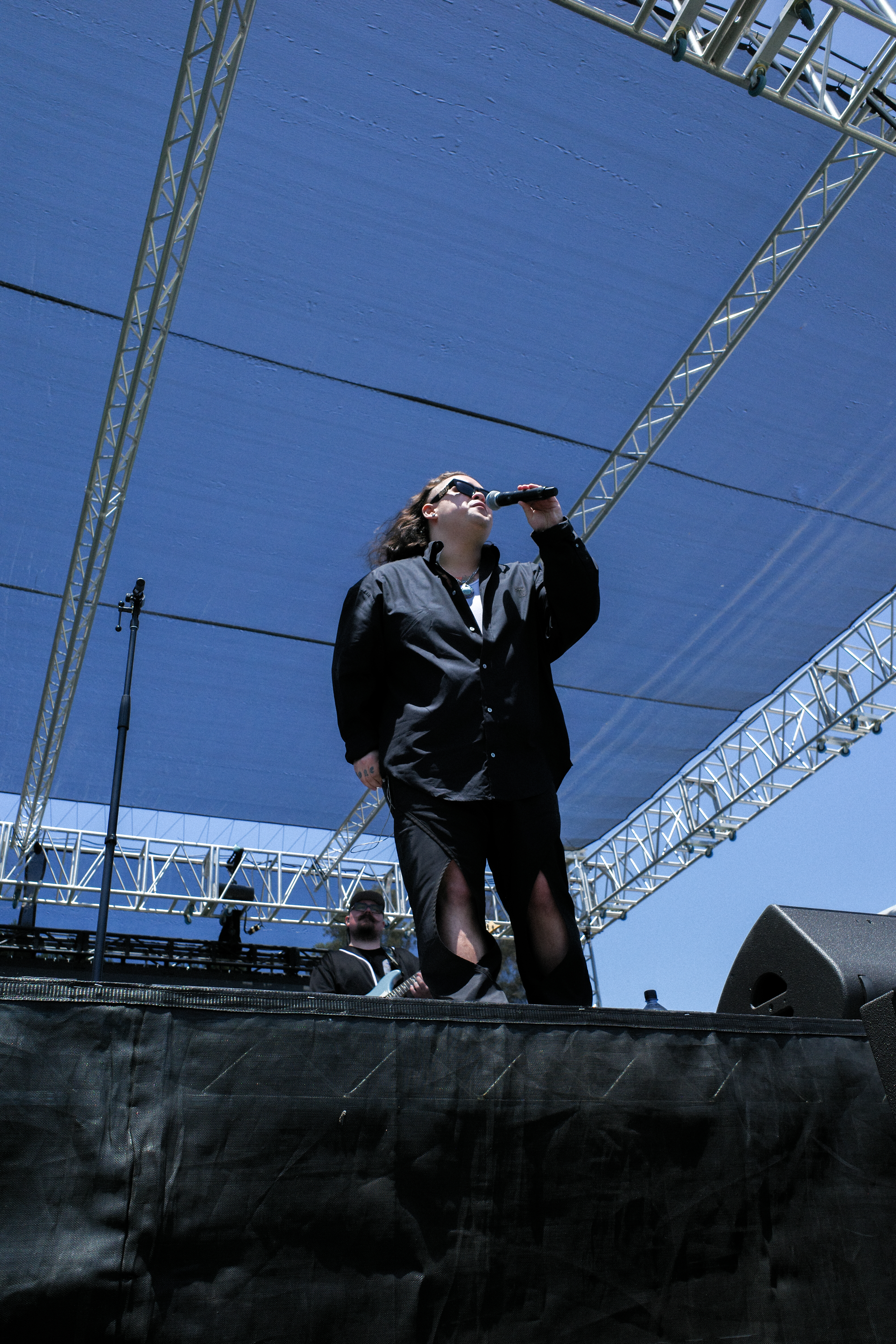

Background information
- Also known as: Zacari P
- Born: Zacari Moses Pacaldo I April 8, 1994 (age 32); Bakersfield, California, U.S.
- Genres: Hip-hop; R&B
- Occupations: Rapper; singer; songwriter; multi-instrumentalist; record producer
- Instruments: Vocals; saxophone; guitar
- Years active: 2016–present
- Label: Top Dawg

Zacari Moses Pacaldo I (born April 8, 1994), known mononymously as Zacari, is an American rapper, singer, songwriter, and multi-instrumentalist. He is best known for his guest appearance on American rapper and Top Dawg Entertainment labelmate Kendrick Lamar's 2017 single "Love", which peaked at number 11 on the Billboard Hot 100. His debut extended play (EP), Run Wild Run Free, was released by the label on March 15, 2019.

== Early life ==
Pacaldo was raised by a highly musical family. His mother, Ede, a former drummer for rock bands, taught Pacaldo how to play the guitar, and his father, Moses, passed down his love of soul, blues, and jazz music. He was enrolled in a school for performing arts by age eight and began learning guitar, followed by drums, saxophone, and keyboards. Pacaldo had a stint in Alaska where he worked for the summer after graduating high school. After finishing high school, he worked seasonally for three years at an Alaska national park, and enrolled in a music school in Los Angeles, California.

== Career ==
Zacari was featured on various Top Dawg Entertainment albums such as The Sun's Tirade, Do What Thou Wilt., Damn, and Black Panther: The Album. Top Dawg announced the signing of Zacari in January 2019, when he released his first single on the label "Don't Trip". His debut EP Run Wild Run Free was released on March 15, 2019.

On April 21, 2020, as part of Top Dawg's Fan Appreciation Week, Zacari released the songs "Edamame" and "This Woman's Work".

In March 2026, he released the single "Jinx".

== Discography ==
=== Studio albums ===
Title	Album details
Bliss	Released: July 12, 2024; Label: Top Dawg; Format: Digital download

=== Extended plays ===
Title	Album details
Run Wild Run Free	Released: March 15, 2019; Label: Top Dawg; Format: Digital download

=== Singles as featured artist ===
List of singles as featured artist, with selected chart positions and certifications, showing year released and album name
Title	Year	Peak chart positions										Certifications	Album
Title	Year	US	US R&B/ HH	US Rap	AUS	CAN	FRA	NZ	PT	SWE	UK	Certifications	Album
"Love" (Kendrick Lamar featuring Zacari)	2017	11	6	5	29	22	88	24	26	58	39	RIAA: 4× Platinum; ARIA: 5× Platinum; BPI: Platinum; MC: 5× Platinum; SNEP: Gold	Damn
"Do Better" (Ab-Soul featuring Zacari)	2022	–	–	–	–	–	–	–	–	–	–		Herbert

=== Certified songs ===
List of certified songs, showing year released and album name
Title	Year	Certifications	Album
"Wat's Wrong" (Isaiah Rashad featuring Zacari and Kendrick Lamar)	2016	RIAA: Platinum	The Sun's Tirade

=== Other guest appearances ===
Title	Year	Other artist(s)	Album
"Paper"	2016	Kembe X, Alex Wiley	Talk Back
"RAW (Backwards)"	2016	Ab-Soul	Do What Thou Wilt.
“Paramedic!”	2018	SOB X RBE, Kendrick Lamar	Black Panther: The Album
"Redemption Interlude"	2018	—N/a	Black Panther: The Album
"Redemption"	2018	Babes Wodumo	Black Panther: The Album
"Mood"	2019	Sir	Chasing Summer
"Raised A Fool"	2019	Kembe X, Jay Rock, Ab-Soul	—N/a
"Homesick"	2020	DJ Scheme, Skrillex	Family
"Sometimes"	2022	Blxst	Before You Go
"Chrome Hearts"	2022	Denzel Curry	Melt My Eyez See Your Future
"Watch It Burn"	2022	isomonstrosity (Ellen Reid, Johan Lenox, and Yuga Cohler)	isomonstrosity
"Momentum"	2025	Skrillex, Starrah, Ilykimchi	Fuck U Skrillex You Think Ur Andy Warhol but Ur Not!! <3
"100Drum"	2025	Amaarae	Black Star
