= The Sun's Tirade =

Studio album by Isaiah Rashad
- Released: September 2, 2016
- Genre: Hip-hop
- Length: 63:12
- Label: TDE
- Producers: The Antydote; Al B. Smoov; Cam O'bi; Carter Lang; Chris Calor; Crooklin; D. Sanders; Dave Free; Deacon Blues; D.K. the Punisher; DzonyBeats; FrancisGotHeat; Free P; J. LBS; Jowin; Mike Will Made It; Steve Lacy; Park Ave.; Pluss; Pops; Tiggi

Isaiah Rashad chronology
Cilvia Demo (2014)	The Sun's Tirade (2016)	The House Is Burning (2021)

Singles from The Sun's Tirade
- 1. "Free Lunch" Released: August 4, 2016

The Sun's Tirade is the debut studio album by American rapper Isaiah Rashad. It was released on September 2, 2016, and is his second release with Top Dawg Entertainment (TDE), following 2014's acclaimed EP Cilvia Demo.

The album, recorded during a period in which Rashad experienced struggles with depression and addiction, features a strongly reflective and conscious tone with production that takes influence from hip-hop, trap, trip hop, soul, and jazz. It features guest appearances from SiR, Zacari, Kendrick Lamar, Deacon Blues, Kari Faux, Syd tha Kyd, Hugh Augustine, Jay Rock and SZA. The album's production was handled by several producers, including Mike Will Made It, D. Sanders, Cam O'bi, J. LBS, The Antydote and Chris Calor.

The Sun's Tirade was met with critical acclaim from music critics, and appeared on numerous end-of-year best album lists from various publications. The album debuted at number 17 on the US Billboard 200, selling 19,000 copies its first week. The album was supported by the critically acclaimed lead single, "Free Lunch".

== Background and promotion ==
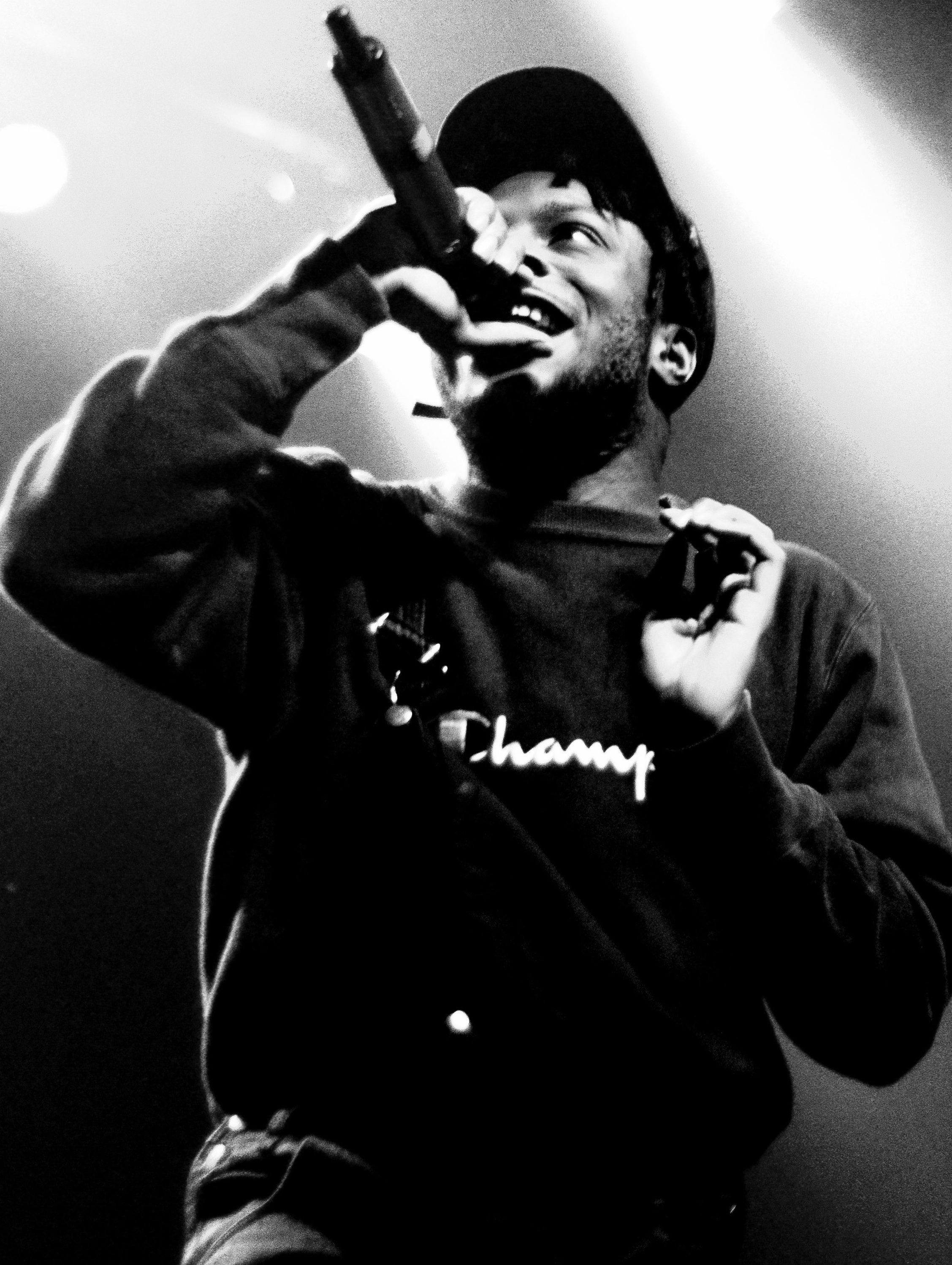
Prior to the release of The Sun's Tirade, Rashad struggled with alcohol and Xanax addiction, along with depression and isolation for two years.

On August 26, 2016, Isaiah Rashad announced the album's title, release date and the reveal of the artwork. On August 30, he shared the album's track listing, which features guest appearances from Kari Faux, Syd and SiR, along with Top Dawg label-mates such as SZA, Jay Rock and Kendrick Lamar. Rashad released The Sun's Tirade on September 2, 2016.

During various interviews in promotion of the album, Rashad revealed that he was addicted to Xanax and alcohol, and was suffering from depression, anxiety and isolation during the time between the release of Cilvia Demo and The Sun's Tirade. He further stated that he "fucked up", and almost got dropped from Top Dawg Entertainment a total of three times during the recording of his album.

I just want them [fans] to enjoy themselves listening to this project. I hope this make it easier for them to approach me, make you feel like you're talking to a regular person. As far as learning about me, I don’t know. You'll learn I got range. I got some more range that you didn't think I had. I want people to be like, "Damn, this nigga can do this?" Because that motivates me a lot.

— Isaiah Rashad, via XXL

"Free Lunch" was released as the album's lead single on August 4, 2016. The music video for the single, directed by APLUS Filmz, was uploaded to Top Dawg Entertainment's YouTube channel on August 10.

On August 27, 2016, Rashad performed "Free Lunch" with Kendrick Lamar during Lamar's headlining set at FYF Fest. On September 17, 2016, he performed "Tity and Dolla" at the BET Hip Hop Awards, which aired in the next month. Rashad also released music videos for the songs "4r da Squaw" and "Park", which have not been released as singles.

The album was removed from streaming services for unknown reasons on October 29, 2024 but has since been restored on Spotify as of November 8, as well as other streaming services by the end of the year.

== Music and lyrics ==
The Sun's Tirade, much like its predecessor, is a loose concept album. The project is characterized by its personal themes, such as substance abuse, depression, and Rashad's personal struggles with alcohol and Xanax addiction. The album incorporates stylistic and production elements of southern hip-hop, jazz, neo soul, trap, and progressive hip-hop. Musically, the project has been noted by publications for its diversity and unique sonic palate, and for being "much more jazzy and upbeat" than Cilvia Demo. Rashad's vocals are layered and textured. His voice throughout the record displays a "heavy rasp" and "sing-songy flow".

== Critical reception ==
Professional ratings
Aggregate scores
Source	Rating
Metacritic	80/100
Review scores
Source	Rating
AllMusic	4/5 stars
The Line of Best Fit	8.5/10
Consequence of Sound	B+
HipHopDX	4/5 stars
Pitchfork	8.1/10
Drowned in Sound	7/10
XXL	4/5

The Sun's Tirade received positive reviews from music critics upon its release. At Metacritic, which assigns a normalized rating out of 100 to reviews from critics, the album received an average score of 80, which indicates "generally positive reviews," based on 11 reviews. Sheldon Pearce of Pitchfork praised The Sun's Tirade, dubbing the album "a complex portrait of a man in transition", and further applauded Rashad for "wear[ing] his anxieties" on his sleeve. Ryan Lunn of The Line of Best Fit lauded the album, saying "while the album may have been crafted during a two-year tsunami of struggle, Isaiah Rashad still manages to sound as calm as an ocean’s gentle waves; sounding so effortless has never taken so much effort." Andy Kellman of Allmusic similarly praised the album, citing its creativity and production as a highlight, while also directing praise at Rashad's rapping, stating "Rashad's voice is dispirited, on the brink of disintegration".

Stephen Kearse of Consequence of Sound reviewed the album favorably, noting the album's "experimental aesthetic" as more refined than on Rashad's previous efforts. In a less positive review, Michael G. Barilleaux of No Ripcord found the album to be boring, stating "Each song on this album makes its own point, but does it in exactly the same tone as the last. The end result is 17 tracks of one sound in a row, all bleeding into each other."

=== Accolades ===
The Sun's Tirade appeared on numerous end-of-year best album lists from various publications.

Publication	List	Rank
Exclaim!	Top 15 Hip-Hop Albums: Best of 2016	13
Inverse	The 10 Greatest Hip-Hop Projects of 2016	8
KSDB-FM	Best 50 Albums of 2016	29
L.A. Weekly	Best Albums of 2016	8
Okayplayer	Reader's Choice: Best Albums of 2016	15
Pigeons and Planes	Best Albums of 2016	25
Pitchfork	The 20 Best Rap Albums of 2016	No order
PopMatters	The Best Hip-Hop Albums of 2016	1
Stereogum	The 40 Best Rap Albums of 2016	39
The Birmingham News	25 of our favorite albums from Southern musicians in 2016	No order
Uproxx	20 Best Rap Albums Of 2016	8

== Commercial performance ==
The album debuted at number 17 on the US Billboard 200, selling 19,000 copies its first week.

== Track listing ==
The Sun's Tirade track listing
No.	Title	Writer(s)	Producer(s)	Length
1.	"Where U At?"	Isaiah McClain; David Friley	Dave Free	0:44
2.	"4r da Squaw"	McClain; Francis Nguyen-Tran	FrancisGotHeat	3:52
3.	"Free Lunch"	McClain; Cameron Osteen	Cam O'bi	3:12
4.	"Rope // Rosegold" (featuring SiR)	McClain; Sir Darryl Farris; Tyran Donaldson; Jason Pounds	J. LBS.; The Antydote	4:43
5.	"Wat's Wrong" (featuring Zacari and Kendrick Lamar)	McClain; Kendrick Duckworth; Zacari Pacaldo	D. Sanders; Al B. Smoov	5:30
6.	"Park"	McClain	Park Ave.; D. Sanders	2:53
7.	"Bday" (featuring Deacon Blues and Kari Faux)	McClain; Kari Johnson	Tiggi; Deacon Blues	3:52
8.	"Silkk da Shocka" (featuring Syd)	McClain; Steven Lacy-Moya; Sydney Bennett	Steve Lacy	2:46
9.	"Tity and Dolla" (featuring Hugh Augustine and Jay Rock)	McClain; Hugh Augustine; Johnny McKinzie	Crooklin; Pops	4:58
10.	"Stuck in the Mud" (featuring SZA)	McClain; Solana Rowe	D. Sanders; Crooklin	7:03
11.	"A Lot"	McClain	Mike Will Made It; Pluss	3:25
12.	"AA"	McClain	Dzonybeats; D. Sanders	3:30
13.	"Dressed Like Rappers"	McClain; Friley	DK the Punisher	3:26
14.	"Don't Matter" (featuring Lance Skiiiwalker)	McClain; Lance Howard	The Antydote; Carter Lang	2:56
15.	"Brenda"	McClain	Calor	4:10
16.	"By George (Outro)"	McClain	Jowin (aka Jiikae)	3:18
17.	"Find a Topic (Homies Begged)"	McClain; Pounds	Free P; J. LBS.	2:48
Total length:				63:12

== Charts ==
Chart (2016)	Peak position
Belgian Albums (Ultratop Flanders)	78
Canadian Albums (Billboard)	39
Dutch Albums (Album Top 100)	82
French Albums (SNEP)	199
New Zealand Albums (RMNZ)	23
Swiss Albums (Schweizer Hitparade)	62
UK Albums (Official Charts)	116
UK R&B Albums (Official Charts)	16
US Billboard 200	17
US Independent Albums (Billboard)	3
US Top R&B/Hip-Hop Albums (Billboard)	4
