= November (Sir album) =

Studio album by SiR
- Released: January 18, 2018
- Recorded: 2017–18
- Genre: R&B; neo soul
- Length: 32:40
- Label: TDE
- Producer: Anthony "Top Dawg" Tiffith (exec.); Andre Harris; DJ Khalil; D.K. The Punisher; Haiyib; Harmony Samuels; J. LBS; MNDSGN; Rascal; Saxon

SiR chronology
HER TOO (2017)	November (2018)	Chasing Summer (2019)

Singles from November
- 1. "Something Foreign" Released: November 30, 2018

November is the second studio album by American singer SiR, released on January 18, 2018 by Top Dawg Entertainment (TDE). The album includes guest features from ScHoolboy Q and Etta Bond, with production coming from DJ Khalil, Saxon, and Andre Harris, among others.

== Singles and promotion ==
The album's first single "Something Foreign" featuring Schoolboy Q was released on November 30, 2018, with the music video premiered on December 27. The song "Summer in November" was accompanied by a music video on the same day as the album's release, and the music video for "D'Evils" was released on May 4, 2018.

== Critical reception ==
Professional ratings
Review scores
Source	Rating
Highsnobiety	3.5/5 stars
HipHopDX	3.8/5
Pitchfork	7.2/10

The album was critically acclaimed and received positive reviews. Pitchfork praised the album, giving it a 7.2 out of 10, claiming "Inglewood singer-songwriter and producer R&B isn’t just R&B. There’s a neo-soul silkiness to many of his songs, with an atmospheric, jazzy vibe in the production—November is an album for lighting incense, not candles. In this sense, he’s TDE’s answer to a moment that has seen acts like Daniel Caesar subtly returning to the genre’s more tender roots with great success."

== Track listing ==
No.	Title	Writer(s)	Producer(s)	Length
1.	"Gone"	Sir Darryl Farris	DJ Khalil	0:45
2.	"That's Alright"	Farris	J. LBS	2:22
3.	"Something Foreign" (featuring ScHoolboy Q)	Farris; Quincy Matthew Hanley	Saxon	2:32
4.	"D'Evils"	Farris	D.K. the Punisher	2:51
5.	"Something New" (featuring Etta Bond)	Farris; Henrietta Bond	Rascal	3:49
6.	"I Know"	Farris	Saxon	2:18
7.	"Never Home"	Farris	Haiyib	2:46
8.	"War"	Farris	MNDSGN	3:40
9.	"Better"	Farris	SiR; DJ Khalil	4:12
10.	"Dreaming of Me"	Farris	Harmony Samuels	3:36
11.	"Summer in November"	Farris	Andre Harris	3:49
Total length:				32:40
