= Bonanza Campout Music Festival =

Annual music festival in Heber, Utah, US

- Genre: Hip hop, Electronica, Indie rock, Alternative rock
- Dates: June 23–25, 2017
- Location: Heber, Utah
- Years active: 2016-19, 2021-
- Website: Official Website

Bonanza Campout Music Festival is an annual music festival held at River's Edge in Heber, Utah. The inaugural year of the festival, which was held on June 10–11, 2016, was headlined by several artists, including: Big Gigantic, Cold War Kids, Emancipator, Savoy and JR JR. The festival boasted 31 artists and two stages: The Bonanza Stage and The Shade Stage. On January 17, 2017, Bonanza Campout announced its official 2017 lineup, featuring headliners of ODESZA, Ms. Lauryn Hill, Nas, and Nick Murphy (FKA Chet Faker).

== Musical acts ==
=== 2016 ===
On April 18, 2016, Bonanza Campout announced its inaugural lineup, featuring Big Gigantic, Cold War Kids, Emancipator, Savoy and JR JR as headliners.

Friday, June 10, 2016

- Big Gigantic
- Emancipator
- JR JR
- Milo Greene
- Ryan Hemsworth
- Vacationer
- Young Empires
- New Beat Fund
- Cale and the Gravity Well
- Lionize
- Doe
- Quiet Oaks
- Scenic Byway
- The Departures
- Legacy Music Alliance

Saturday, June 11, 2016

- Cold War Kids
- Savoy
- Louis the Child
- Joywave
- Jamie N Commons
- Parade of Lights
- Secret Weapons
- Manic Focus
- Joshua James
- Kyle Bent
- Clyde Burnswell
- Le Voir
- High Octane
- Joel Pack & The Pops
- Red Dog Revival
- Daisy & The Moonshines

=== 2017 ===
On January 17, 2017, Bonanza Campout announced its official 2017 lineup, featuring headliners of ODESZA, Ms. Lauryn Hill, Nas, and Nick Murphy (FKA Chet Faker).

Below is the lineup listed in the order as they appear on the official lineup poster, as of May 13, 2017:

- ODESZA
- Ms. Lauryn Hill
- Nas
- Nick Murphy (FKA Chet Faker)
- Cut Copy
- Airborne Toxic Event
- Wale
- KONGOS
- Duke Dumont
- MUTEMATH
- CHERUB
- Bob Moses
- Jai Wolf
- Method Man
- Redman
- LANY
- Slow Magic
- Big Wild
- Waka Flocka Flame
- EDEN
- The Knocks
- TOKiMONSTA
- Robert DeLong
- FRENSHIP
- Kaiydo
- Harrison Brome
- R.LUM.R
- Michl
- Chet Porter
- Honors
- The Moth & The Flame
- Kiev
- Kyle Bent
- SECRETS
- Avalon Landing
- Cale & The Gravity Well
- oCeLoT
