= Wat's Wrong =

2016 song by Isaiah Rashad featuring Zacari and Kendrick Lamar

Song by Isaiah Rashad featuring Zacari and Kendrick Lamar

from the album The Sun's Tirade
- Released: September 2, 2016
- Genre: Hip hop
- Length: 5:30
- Label: TDE
- Songwriters: Isaiah McClain; Zacari Pacaldo; Kendrick Duckworth
- Producers: D. Sanders; Al B. Smoov

"Wat's Wrong" is a song by American rapper Isaiah Rashad from his debut studio album The Sun's Tirade (2016). It features American singer Zacari and American rapper Kendrick Lamar. Produced by D. Sanders and Al B. Smoov, it contains samples of "Here I Am" by Stanley Cowell and "Man Undercover" by Timbaland and Magoo featuring Aaliyah.

== Composition ==
In the song, Isaiah Rashad focuses on dealing with his struggles in life and love, including his Xanax addiction which he discusses in the final verse. He explores the theme of battling his emotions, as does Kendrick Lamar, while Zacari performs the melodic chorus. Lamar asserts his dominance in the hip hop industry, while also considering spreading positive messages to his audience. In addition, Lamar takes a shot at Donald Trump as he raps about vandalizing the Trump Tower.

== Critical reception ==
The song received generally positive reviews. Peter A. Berry of XXL remarked that Kendrick Lamar "definitely walks away with the best verse", adding "If he keeps coming with bars like those, no one will be able to dispute his claim." Marshall Gu of Pretty Much Amazing praised Isaiah Rashad's rapping, stating "there's no real point to singling out a line or two as Rashad shoots a steady but rapid clip of syllables throughout the entire verse"; he also lauded the performances of the other artists, writing that Lamar "hooks Rashad up with a show-stealing verse with unique rhymes and rhyme schemes" and "It helps that the chorus is a catchy melody and the beat is gorgeous: a wafting female vocal that reminds me of RZA's 'Ice Cream'." Reviewing The Sun's Tirade for XXL, Chris Gibbons wrote "The brutal, genuine honesty that comes across in Rashad's music is similar to that which Kendrick Lamar has worked to success. So it's no surprise that one of the biggest highlights of the album is the two artists working together on 'Wat's Wrong.' Rashad's introspective raps complement K. Dot's verse about his motivations." Alex Bell of HipHopDX described Rashad as "proving his worth" by "going bar for bar with K. Dot" on the song.

== Certifications ==
Region	Certification	Certified units/sales
United States (RIAA)	Platinum	1,000,000^{‡}
^{‡} Sales+streaming figures based on certification alone.
