= Andrew Gouche =

American gospel musician

Andrew Gouche (born May 27, 1959) is an American gospel bass player and has been referred to as "the godfather of gospel bass players".

== Career ==
Over the years Gouche has performed and recorded with: Rev. James Cleveland, Walter & Edwin Hawkins, The Winans, Yolonda Adams, BeBe & CeCe Winans, Destiny's Child, Andraé Crouch, Mavis Staples, The Mississippi Mass Choir, The Mighty Clouds of Joy, Ladysmith Black Mambazo, and Vanessa Bell-Armstrong. Non-gospel musicians he has worked alongside include: Joe Cocker, Prince, Whitney Houston, Julio Iglesias, Michael Jackson, Gladys Knight, Billy Preston, Donna Summer, Dionne Warwick, and The Temptations. Gouche worked as Music Director for Chaka (from Chaka Khan) for six years. In 2009 he formed the Band of Brothers with Eddie Brown, Chris Coleman, Donald Hayes and Yohei Nakamura. being its bandleader, music director and sideman.

== Awards and recognition ==
Gouche earned a Grammy for his work on Mary Mary's album “Thankful.” His performance was recognized by Michael Tobias Design, who then released the Andrew Gouche Signature bass. He also impressed Prince who soon thereafter selected him to work on his recordings and tours.
