= Same Shit =

2026 single by Isaiah Rashad

Single by Isaiah Rashad

from the album It's Been Awful
- Released: April 10, 2026
- Recorded: 2022–2026
- Genre: Southern hip-hop
- Length: 3:13
- Label: TDE; Warner
- Songwriters: Isaiah McClain; Mario Dragoi; Nathaniel Hobden; Luc Randmaa
- Producers: Mario Luciano; Nate Hobden; Don Oskar; Julian Sintonia

Isaiah Rashad singles chronology
"Chaos" (2025)	"Same Shit" (2026)	"Boy in Red" (2026)

Music video
- "Same Shit" on YouTube

"Same Shit" (stylized as "Same Sh!t") is a song by American rapper Isaiah Rashad, released on April 10, 2026 as the lead single from his third studio album It's Been Awful (2026). It was produced by Mario Luciano, Nate Hobden and Don Oskar, with additional production from Julian Sintonia. The song contains interpolations of "Praise the Lord (Da Shine)" by ASAP Rocky featuring Skepta and "Da Blow" by Lil Jon & the East Side Boyz.

== Background ==
Isaiah Rashad said of the song, "Conceptually, the song reflects what matters most to me, my family, taking care of myself, and the everyday grind. At its core, it's about hustling and putting in the work every single day."

== Composition ==
The song contains elements of Southern hip-hop, with Isaiah Rashad rapping in a staccato delivery and flow described as resembling a "more-lackadaisical Three 6 Mafia or DMX." Over production consisting of rattling drums, he discusses the cyclical nature of his habits and mentality, as well as navigating everyday pressure. He lists his priorities and personal issues that trouble him, including his struggles with drug addiction.

== Critical reception ==
The song received generally positive reviews. Tallie Spencer of HotNewHipHop wrote "The production on the track truly sets the tone and allows Rashad's delivery and flow to shine. It's a laid-back but dark, introspective track that feels right in his pocket." She described his flow as "repetitive, in a good way". Wesley McLean of Exclaim! commented that Rashad's performance "creates an interesting dichotomy: the content portraying a man living a little too fast, but set to a dark, airy instrumental backed by knocking drums, rattling hi-hats and snares that accentuate the poise he exhibits rapping in this pocket, as if his voice were an extra layer of percussion. This is a safe single on the surfaced [sic], but in the greater context of the album, it serves a strong purpose." Chase McMullen of Beats per Minute stated "'Same Shit', with its more overtly ominous, threatening nature is propelled by an instantly recognizable listing of realities as a chorus."

== Music video ==
The music video was directed by Omar Jones and released alongside the single. It depicts Isaiah Rashad in an internal battle, as he finds himself in a surreal landscape and confronts a version of himself. The visuals blur the lines between reality and illusion and reflect themes of pressure, growth, and self-awareness.

== Charts ==
Chart performance for "Same Shit"
Chart (2026)	Peak position
US Hot R&B/Hip-Hop Songs (Billboard)	39
US Rhythmic Airplay (Billboard)	9
