= YGTUT =

American rapper

- Born: Kevin Lebron Adams Jr. December 19, 1991 (age 34); Chattanooga, Tennessee, U.S.
- Genre: Hip hop
- Occupations: Rapper; singer; songwriter; record producer
- Years active: 2011–present
- Labels: Same Plate; Sony
- Member of: TheHouse

Kevin Lebron Adams, Jr. (born December 19, 1991), better known by his stage name YGTUT (or simply, TUT), is an American rapper, singer and record producer. He first gained recognition and acclaim after the release of his 2015 mixtape, Preacher's Son. He is signed to Same Plate Entertainment and Sony Music. He is a founding member of the Chattanooga, Tennessee-based hip-hop collective TheHouse, which he formed with rappers Isaiah Rashad, Michael Da Vinci (MikeyD), Chris P, and Brian Brown.

== Early life and education ==
Kevin Adams Jr. was born and raised in Chattanooga, Tennessee. His father is a Baptist preacher and his mother a gospel singer. Adams grew up attending church and would often play the organ or drums after service. He first started rapping when he was 13 or 14 after his father brought him to a studio. In around 2010, he began attending Middle Tennessee State University. While there, he met fellow recording artist, Isaiah Rashad, and the two formed an artist collective called "TheHouse". Both artists ended up dropping out and moving back to Chattanooga to focus on music full time.

== Career ==
YGTUT began working on and releasing music in around 2011. He also went by the stage name, "Kev Adams", for a time. He first garnered significant interest in late 2014 by releasing a series of tracks, including "Hangin'", "Holy Water" (featuring Angel Mae), and "Live From Chattanooga". Those songs would form the basis of his first mixtape, Preacher's Son, which was released in January 2015. The album featured guest appearances and production work from several members of TheHouse including Isaiah Rashad, Michael Da Vinci, and Ktoven. Another House member, Swayyvo, played saxophone on the mixtape. The album received a favorable review from Pitchfork.

In August 2016, TUT released the single "G35" featuring Isaiah Rashad. Later that year, he was featured on the Zzz track, "The Cost". In June 2017, TUT was featured on a track ("Long Day") as part of TheHouse collective. Fellow members Brian Brown, Michael Da Vinci, and Chris P also delivered verses on the song. In December of that year, TUT released the solo single, "$leezy Money". Later that month, he appeared on another release by TheHouse, this time an EP entitled Four Two Three (a reference to the area code in Chattanooga). YGTUT and $hoey were the only two members to appear on all the collection's songs.

In February 2018, he released a track called "Trill Dreams" featuring Isaiah Rashad. The song had been recorded in 2011 when the two were still attending Middle Tennessee State University together. In April 2018, TUT was featured on the Hippy Soul song, "Tides". In June of that year, it was announced that he had been signed to Same Plate Entertainment and Sony Music. Beginning in August, he started periodically releasing new songs in a SoundCloud playlist called Save It. These tracks included "Loyalty 2 da Fam", "Late", and "Top of the World".

In December 2018, he premiered the song, "Get It". It would serve as the lead single on his Same Plate/Sony debut EP, I.O.U., which was released in January 2019.

In 2021, YGTUT appeared on Isaiah Rashad's album The House is Burning, featuring on the track "Chad".

== Discography ==
=== Studio albums ===
List of studio albums, with selected details
Title	Details
In My Head	Released: June 9, 2022; Label: Same Plate, Sony; Formats: Digital download, streaming

=== Mixtapes ===
List of mixtapes, with selected details
Title	Details
Preacher's Son	Released: January 5, 2015; Label: Self-released; Formats: Digital download, streaming

=== EPs ===
List of extended plays, with selected details
Title	Details
I.O.U.	Released: January 18, 2019; Label: Same Plate, Sony; Formats: Digital download, streaming

=== Singles ===
List of singles with selected details
Title	Year	Album
"Hangin'"	2014	Preacher's Son
"Holy Water" (featuring Angel Mae)	2014	Preacher's Son
"Live From Chattanooga"	2014	Preacher's Son
"G35" (featuring Isaiah Rashad)	2016	Non-album single
"Keep It Cool"	2018	Non-album single
"Get It"	2018	I.O.U.
"Mind Ya Business"	2019	I.O.U.
"Bootleggers"	2020	Non-album single
"Chattanooga Vendetta"	2020	Non-album single
"Dolla $igns" (featuring Michael Da Vinci)	2021	In My Head
"New Medallion"	2022	In My Head
"Thinkin Bout"	2022	In My Head
"Quickie"	2022	In My Head
