= Freaky Deaky Music Festival =

Music festival

Freaky Deaky Music Festival is a festival held on October 30 – November 1 in Austin, Texas to celebrate Halloween. The festival was founded by React Presents in 2008, which began a big Halloween party featuring carnival rides, games, costume contests, art, music and more. The festival has featured a range of artists including Bassnectar, Pretty Lights, Carnage, Schoolboy Q, and Keys n Krates.
