= Alex Wiley =

American rapper

- Born: Alexander William Wiley; June 5, 1993 (age 33); Chicago, Illinois, U.S.
- Genre: Hip-hop
- Occupations: Rapper; singer; songwriter
- Instrument: Vocals
- Years active: 2010-present
- Labels: Closed Sessions; Empire

Alexander William Wiley (born June 5, 1993), known professionally as Alex Wiley, is an American rapper from Chicago, Illinois.

== Career ==
Alex began interest in music in grade school when he began playing the violin. Soon after, he began making hip-hop music. In high school, he joined a hip-hop collective named Swag Village (later shortened to The Village) with Kembe X, Monster Mike, Isaiah Rashad, Jean Deaux, Spiff, and The Magician. The Village was closely associated with another Chicago-based collective, Savemoney.

He was featured on the song "Windows" by Chance the Rapper in 2011, which appeared on Chance's 2012 mixtape 10 Day. He also released an EP with Kembe X in 2012 titled Can I Borrow a Dollar?, followed by mixtapes Club Wiley in 2013, and Village Party in 2014.

In March 2015 Wiley released one singular flame emoji, followed in November by Village Party 2: Heaven's Gate, which eventually ranked among the top 40 albums on iTunes. In September 2015, a remix of his song "Japanese" placed at number 22 on Billboard's Emerging Artists chart. He was a finalist for the 10th spot in XXL's Annual Freshman Class in 2015, but was ultimately not chosen.

He was featured on Chance the Rapper's 2016 song "Grown Ass Kid." However, due to clearance issues and the leaking of the song prior to the release, the song was not included on Chance's mixtape, Coloring Book. In the same year, he released an album titled Tangerine Dream.

His released two albums in 2017, Village Party III: Stoner Symphony and Synthia Part 1: Dial Tone, which were both produced by Mike Gao. In 2019, he released Tangerine Dream II.

Wiley has also worked with other acclaimed artists such as Action Bronson, Freddie Gibbs, Hoodie Allen, Mick Jenkins, Vic Mensa, and Pouya.

== Discography ==
=== Mixtapes ===
Title	Album details
Club Wiley	Released: May 5, 2013; Format: Digital download, streaming, CD
Village Party	Released: June 5, 2014; Format: Digital download, streaming

=== Studio albums ===
Title	Album details
Village Party 2: Heavens Gate	Released: November 20, 2015; Format: Digital download, streaming
Tangerine Dream	Released: June 12, 2016; Format: Digital download, streaming
Village Party III: Stoner Symphony (with Mike Gao)	Released: January 18, 2017; Format: Digital download, streaming
Synthia Part 1: Dial Tone (with Mike Gao)	Released: September 21, 2017; Format: Digital download, streaming
Tangerine Dream II	Released: February 22, 2019; Format: Digital download, streaming

=== Extended plays ===
Title	Album details
Can I Borrow a Dollar? (with Kembe X)	Released: March 3, 2012; Format: Digital download
one singular flame emoji	Released: March 10, 2015; Format: Digital download, streaming
