= Kembe X =

American rapper

- Born: Dikembe Jabari Caston; August 9, 1994 (age 32); South Holland, Illinois
- Origin: Chicago, Illinois
- Genre: Hip-hop
- Occupations: Rapper; singer; songwriter
- Instrument: Vocals
- Years active: 2010-present
- Labels: Village 777; Closed Sessions; Scion AV; FocusGroup; Empire; BMR

Dikembe Jabari Caston (born August 9, 1994), better known by his stage name Kembe X, is an American rapper from South Holland, Illinois.

== Early life and career ==
Dikembe attended multiple high schools in Chicago, including Marian Catholic and De La Salle Institute, where he met eventual collaborator Chance the Rapper. He dropped out in 2010 and began recording music, later releasing his debut mixtape Self Rule in 2011. Forbes ranked it the seventh best free album of 2011.

He was a member of a hip-hop collective named Swag Village (later shortened to The Village) with Alex Wiley, Monster Mike, Isaiah Rashad, Jean Deaux, Spiff, and The Magician. The Village was closely associated with another Chicago-based collective, Savemoney. He was also a member of a short-lived duo named Xandercast with rapper Jody Duff.

He released an EP with Alex Wiley in 2012 titled Can I Borrow a Dollar? In 2013 he released Soundtrack II Armageddon. In June 2013 he was interviewed by Cole Bennett, which was Bennett's first Youtube video. Also in 2013, Kembe moved to Los Angeles.

In 2014, his songs "Caged Bird" and "As I Unfold" placed at number 21 and 27, respectively, on Billboard's Emerging Artists chart. Both songs appeared on his self-titled EP. In April 2015, the single "Feeling Like the Man" ranked number 34 on the Emerging Artists chart, followed by "Hereditary (2 Bitches)" at number 26 in June.

He released his debut studio album Talk Balk in 2016, followed by I Was Depressed Until I Made This in 2019. Also in 2019, he toured with Schoolboy Q. In 2024 he released two albums, including a collaboration with Hippie Sabotoge. In 2026, he performed at South by Southwest as a showcasing artist for TDE.

Other notable artists he has collaborated with include Ab-Soul, Denzel Curry, and Guapdad 4000.

== Discography ==
=== Mixtapes ===
Title	Album details
Self Rule	Released: November 25, 2011; Format: Digital download, streaming
Soundtrack II Armageddon	Released: May 28, 2013; Format: Digital download, streaming

=== Studio albums ===
Title	Album details
Talk Balk	Released: July 15, 2016; Format: Digital download, streaming
I Was Depressed Until I Made This	Released: October 11, 2019; Format: Digital download, streaming
Sleep Paralysis (with Hippie Sabotoge)	Released: March 15, 2024; Format: Digital download, streaming, LP
it's not that deep	Released: October 25, 2024; Format: Digital download, streaming

=== Extended plays ===
Title	Album details
Can I Borrow a Dollar? (with Alex Wiley)	Released: March 3, 2012; Format: Digital download
Kembe X	Released: August 19, 2014; Format: Digital download, streaming, EP
