= Isaiah Rashad =

American rapper (born 1991)

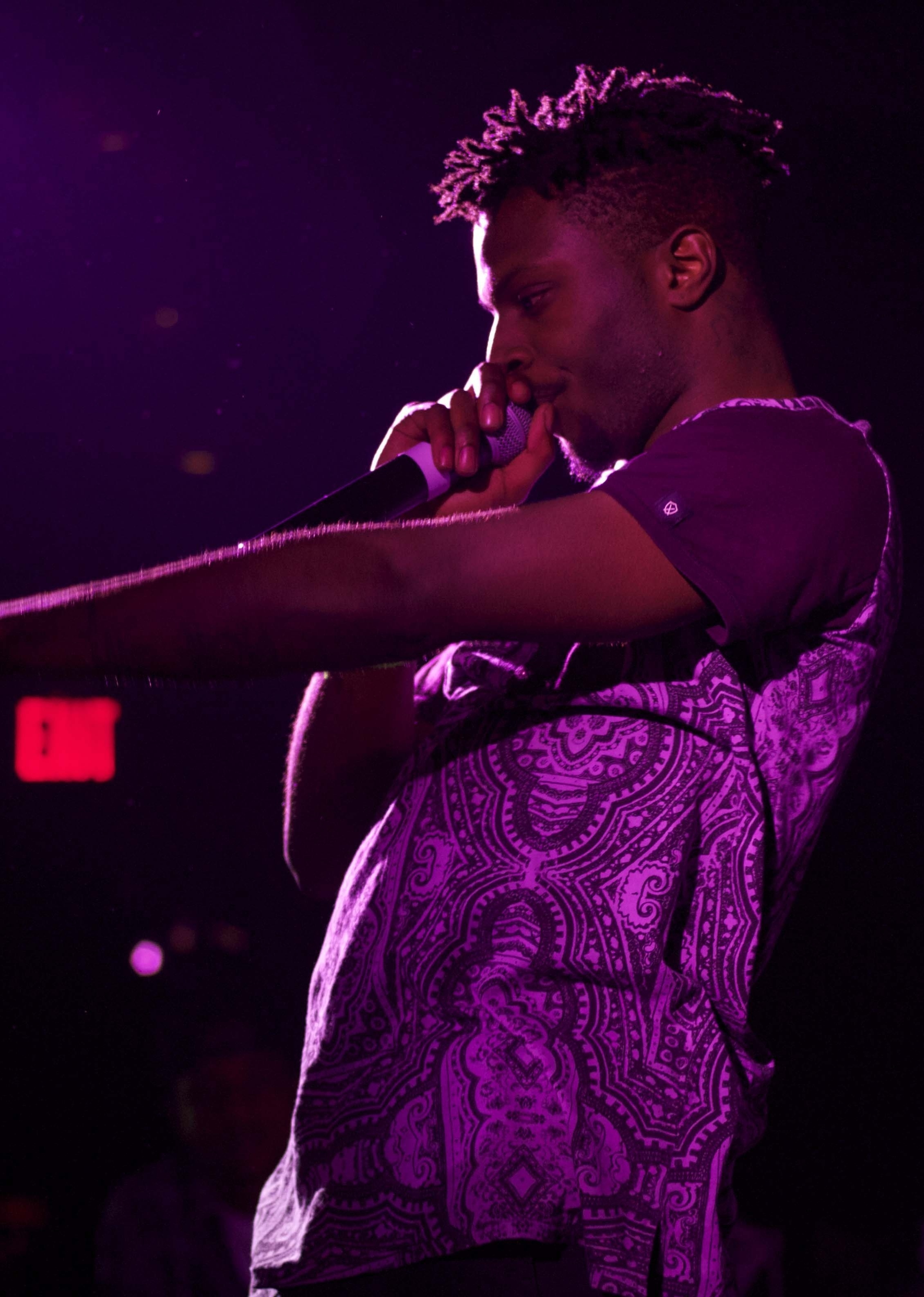
- Isaiah Rashad performing in 2014

Background information
- Born: Isaiah Rashad Joel McClain; May 16, 1991 (age 35); Chattanooga, Tennessee, U.S.
- Genre: Southern hip-hop
- Occupations: Rapper; singer; songwriter; record producer
- Years active: 2009–present
- Labels: Top Dawg; Warner
- Member of: TheHouse
- Children: 3
- Website: isaiahrashad.com

Isaiah Rashad Joel McClain (born May 16, 1991) is an American rapper and singer. He first gained recognition following his performances on the 2012 Smoker's Club Tour alongside rappers Juicy J, Joey Badass and Smoke DZA. He is a founding member of the Chattanooga, Tennessee-based hip-hop collective TheHouse, which he formed with rappers YGTUT, Michael Da Vinci (MikeyD), Chris P, and Brian Brown.

McClain signed with the Carson, California-based record label, Top Dawg Entertainment to release his debut EP, Cilvia Demo (2014). Met with universal acclaim, it marked his first entry on the Billboard 200 and foresaw McClain's inclusion as part of XXL Magazine's 2014 Annual Freshman Class issue. His debut studio album, The Sun's Tirade (2016) was met with continued praise and peaked at number 17 on the chart. McClain signed with Warner Bros. Records to release his long-delayed second album and major label debut, The House Is Burning (2021). Following another five-year hiatus, Rashad's third studio album, titled It's Been Awful, was released in May 2026 to critical acclaim.

== Early life ==
Isaiah Rashad Joel McClain was born on May 16, 1991, in Chattanooga, Tennessee. He was raised primarily by his mother, who is a hairdresser. When he was young, Rashad's father would let him stay up late while they listened to Too $hort and Scarface. His father left the family when Rashad was three. Rashad briefly had ambitions of becoming a preacher. After his stepbrother lent him a copy of OutKast's ATLiens in junior high, Rashad started spending most of his time rapping. In his youth, Isaiah's mother and stepfather were part of the Five-Percent Nation and he recounts going to a mosque with them.

== Career ==
=== 2009–2012: beginnings ===
Rashad first began rapping seriously in tenth grade, while he and his friends would record on laptops. The first stage name he used was Zay Taylor. After high school, he went to Middle Tennessee State University. Then, his friend who went to school for music production introduced Rashad to a friend who had a recording studio. As it turned out, the man happened to be his cousin and he let Rashad record there for free. Once his cousin moved on to a different job, Rashad bounced around a couple of local studios. He stopped going to school and lived wherever he could record.

He began getting industry connects, forging relationships with DJ Z and Max Pete from DJBooth.net and Jeff Weiss who writes for Rolling Stone. From that his music began getting passed around to various A&R's. From July 13 to August 23, 2012, Isaiah Rashad toured with Juicy J, Joey Badass and Smoke DZA among others, on the 2012 Smoker's Club Tour. In December 2012, Rashad began getting attention from various record labels, most of which he showed no interest in. He also released many free singles on SoundCloud using beats from well known producers such as MF Doom and Flying Lotus, which helped increase his popularity.

=== 2013–2014: label signing and Cilvia Demo ===
In March 2013, Rashad met production team Digi+Phonics' Dave Free, who then introduced him to Anthony Tiffith, the CEO of Carson, California-based independent record label Top Dawg Entertainment (TDE). On June 3, 2013, it was reported that Rashad was the recent buzz about signing to Top Dawg Entertainment, home to rappers such as Kendrick Lamar, ScHoolboy Q, Ab-Soul and Jay Rock. However, the label did not release an official statement. Over the following months the label and Rashad remained coy about the signing, not confirming anything.

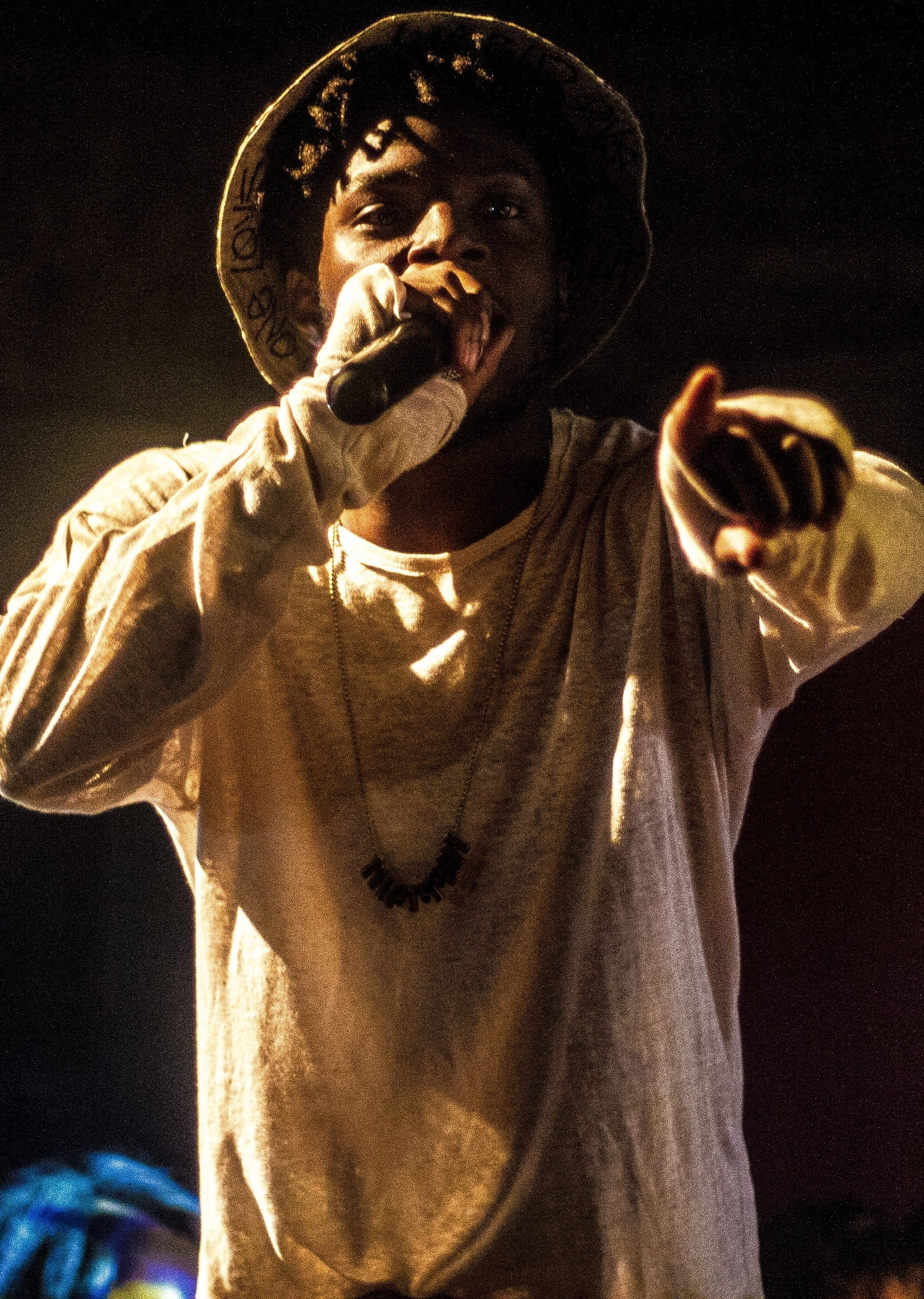
Rashad in 2014

Then on September 20, 2013, Top Dawg Entertainment made the signing official with Top Dawg announcing it over Twitter. However, he revealed he had been signed to the label since March. Following the signing, Rashad moved to Carson, California, and began living and recording at the TDE Red Room Studio. To celebrate the signing announcement, a music video for a new song titled "Shot You Down" was released. It was his first new song released in over a year. The video had been recently shot in his hometown of Chattanooga, Tennessee. On October 1, 2013, a video was released of Rashad signing his contract with TDE.

On October 15, 2013, Isaiah Rashad made his national television debut when he participated in the TDE Cypher during the 2013 BET Hip Hop Awards, alongside his label-mates Kendrick Lamar, Ab-Soul, ScHoolboy Q and Jay Rock. XXL praised the verse as strong, even through the high pressure Rashad had to impress the masses. Entertainment Weekly also praised his verse during the cypher. On October 18, 2013, the remix to "Shot You Down" featuring ScHoolboy Q and Jay Rock was released via SoundCloud. On November 7, 2013, Rashad told Revolt that he would be releasing his very first official project Cilvia during December 2013. Closing out 2013, HipHopDX named Rashad a runner-up for their award for "Rising Star of the Year". In early January 2014, Complex named him one of the new rappers most likely to "blow up" during 2014. In mid-January 2014, Rashad revealed that the mixtape Cilvia would now be his debut extended play (EP) and would not contain many featured artists. On January 17, CEO Top Dawg revealed the cover artwork for the EP and that Cilvia Demo would be released digitally on January 28, 2014. It revealed features from TDE's SZA and Jay Rock and ScHoolboy Q on the remix of "Shot You Down". The day before the EP's release, Rashad released the music video for the Cilvia Demo song, "Soliloquy".

As promised, Cilvia Demo was released on January 28, 2014, via digital download retailers and was made available in CD format exclusively from Top Dawg Entertainment's website. Cilvia Demo received widespread acclaim upon its release and debuted at number 40 on the US Billboard 200 chart, selling 8,500 copies in the United States during its first week of release.

=== 2014–2016: The Sun's Tirade and further recognition ===
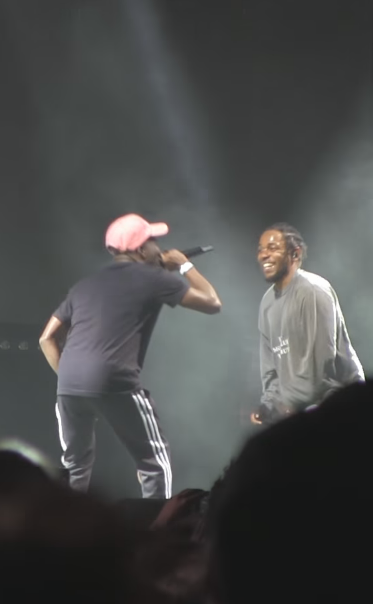
Rashad (left) and Kendrick Lamar at FYF Fest in August 2016

From March 1 to June 1, 2014, Rashad toured with ScHoolboy Q for the entirety of his international tour supporting his third studio album Oxymoron. On May 5, 2014, XXL revealed Rashad was included in their annual freshman class, alongside fellow up-and-comers Chance the Rapper, Ty Dolla $ign, Rich Homie Quan, Vic Mensa, August Alsina, Troy Ave, Kevin Gates, Lil Bibby, Jon Connor, Lil Durk and Jarren Benton. On July 18, 2014, Rashad performed at the Pitchfork Music Festival. The following year, it was announced that Rashad will be included in a docu-series by Sprite, which will support the brand's "Obey Your Verse" Lyrical Collection.

On August 30, 2015, Rashad tweeted that he had completed and turned in his anticipated follow-up project to Cilvia Demo, and that it would be released soon. On September 20, 2015, Anthony "Top Dawg" Tiffith stated that new material from Rashad would arrive by the end of 2015. On September 23, 2015, Rashad released a new single entitled "Nelly", to critical acclaim. It was later confirmed by Rashad through a deleted tweet, that his upcoming follow-up project would be his debut studio album. On January 14, 2016, the album's second single, "Smile", was released on the internet to positive reception.

In August 2016, he released the single "Free Lunch" to wide acclaim, and later confirmed his debut studio album's release date. After releasing two new tracks, "I Mean" and "Park", Rashad released his debut studio album, titled The Sun's Tirade, on September 2, 2016, to widespread critical acclaim. The album debuted at number 17 on the US Billboard 200, selling 19,000 copies its first week.

Rashad's first U.S. headlining tour, the Lil Sunny Tour, began in January 2017 and stopped in 22 cities. In response to several sold-out shows, Rashad extended the tour into 24 additional cities, as well as adding second shows in Chicago, Boston and New York.

=== 2017–present: The House Is Burning and It's Been Awful ===
On October 23, 2017, Rashad issued several tweets hinting at a new album coming. The album, which would be the second studio album and third full-length project coming from Rashad and Top Dawg Entertainment, would follow successful releases by fellow TDE artists SZA and Kendrick Lamar. In May 2019, Rashad played excerpts of various unreleased tracks. During an Instagram live video on June 20, 2019, he played a new excerpts of a song produced by Kenny Beats and announced the title of his upcoming studio album to be The House Is Burning. On April 22, 2020, Rashad released the song "Why Worry" as part of TDE's Fan Appreciation Week.

In an interview for The Fader, Rashad announced The House Is Burning was slated for release in June 2021. On May 7, 2021, Rashad released the albums first single, "Lay wit Ya" featuring Duke Deuce, alongside a music video directed by Omar Jones. It was also announced on all digital platform credits for the song that Rashad signed a joint venture with Warner Bros. Records. On June 17, 2021, Rashad released the album's second single "Headshots (4r da Locals)." A music video for the song was released six days later, directed by Jack Begert and Mez Heirs. On July 7, 2021, Rashad revealed the album's cover art and a July 30 release date, via his social media platforms. Pitchfork rated this release a 7.6 out of 10.

Rashad's third studio album, titled It's Been Awful, was released on May 1, 2026. Its lead single, "Same Shit", was released on April 10, accompanied with a music video. The album was met with critical acclaim. He is scheduled to embark on the Lil Sunny's Awful Road Trip Tour with support from Alemeda in 2026 in support of the album.

== Artistry ==
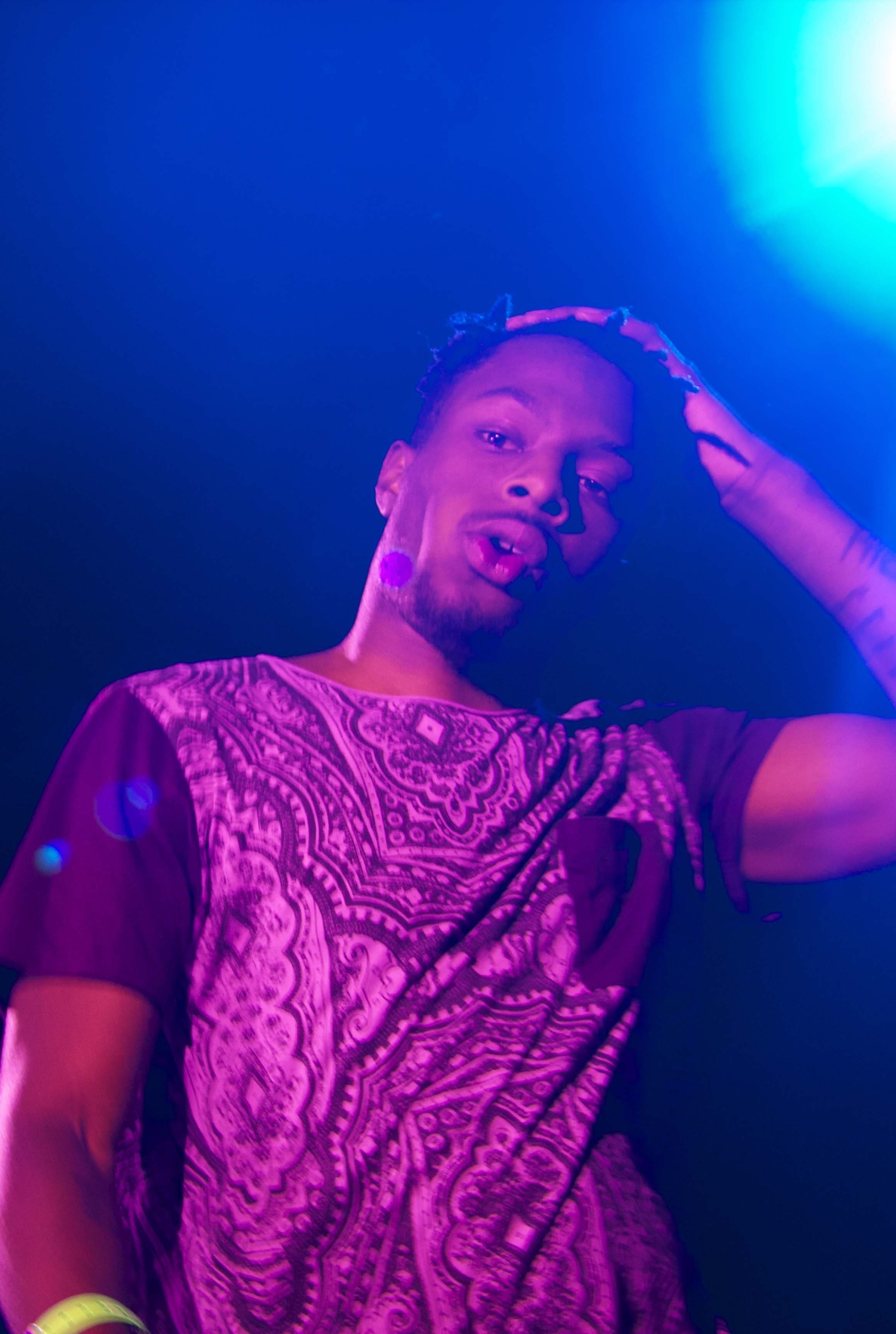
Rashad in 2014

Rashad's music is characterized by its woozy, often nostalgic tone and conscious lyrics that touch on topics of depression, drug addiction, and family. Jason Moore of Complex said, "Rashad spits thoughtfully, intelligently, and with precision, morphing his delivery to fit different production styles and making each line count."

=== Influences ===
Rashad has credited OutKast, namely Big Boi, Scarface, and Jay-Z, as well as Erykah Badu, Gnarls Barkley, ScHoolboy Q, T.I. and Lil Wayne as the biggest influences to his music. Rashad also names Nas, Snoop Dogg, No Limit Records, Cash Money Records, The Fugees, KRS-One, Dead Prez, Kanye West, Little Brother, Three 6 Mafia, 8Ball & MJG, UGK, George Clinton, James Brown, The Temptations, Smokey Robinson, Gorillaz and Danger Mouse among artists he grew up influenced by or still listens to.

== Personal life ==
Rashad has three children. Upon signing with Top Dawg Entertainment, he got a tattoo of the label's logo to commemorate the partnership.

In a 2014 interview with Vice, Rashad revealed that at age 19 he had suicidal tendencies and attempted suicide multiple times. During promotion of The Sun's Tirade in 2016, Rashad revealed that he had been addicted to Xanax and alcohol, and was suffering from depression, anxiety and isolation during the time between the release of Cilvia Demo and The Sun's Tirade. He further stated that due to his behavior, he was almost dropped from Top Dawg Entertainment three times during the recording of the album. He stated that he was no longer taking Xanax and only drinks socially. After 2016, Rashad began using crystal meth and cocaine, and completed rehab in 2020. After a sex tape of Rashad was leaked in 2022, Rashad attempted suicide by driving his BMW M3 into a wall.

=== Sexual orientation ===
On February 9, 2022, two sex tapes of Rashad and other men were leaked, including one in which Rashad said he had been paid, which sparked discussion online about his sexuality. Rashad acknowledged the leaks during his Coachella 2022 performance in April, saying that fans' positive messages had "kept [him] alive these last couple of months". In May 2022, in an interview with Joe Budden, Rashad revealed that he identified as sexually fluid after exploring his sexuality in recent years, and was "still learning about it myself." Later in May 2026, in an interview on The Breakfast Club, Rashad referred to himself as bisexual.

== Discography ==
- The Sun's Tirade (2016)
- The House Is Burning (2021)
- It's Been Awful (2026)
