= JMSN =

American singer and songwriter

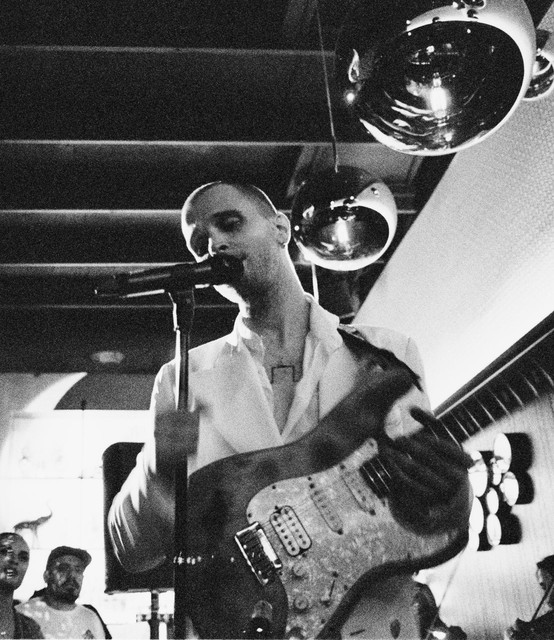

Background information
- Born: Christian Berishaj; Dallas, Texas, U.S.
- Origin: Eastpointe, Michigan, U.S.
- Genres: Alternative R&B; electronica; soul; rock; hip-hop
- Occupations: Singer-songwriter; record producer; audio engineer; mixer; music video director
- Instruments: Vocals; guitar; bass guitar; violin; drums
- Years active: 2012–present
- Label: White Room Records
- Website: iamjmsn.com

Christian Berishaj, known professionally as JMSN (pronounced "Jameson"), is an Albanian-American singer, songwriter, multi-instrumentalist, and record producer. Born in Dallas and raised in Detroit, JMSN has been an influential figure in the contemporary R&B and alternative music scenes.

== Early life ==
Berishaj was born in Dallas, Texas, and grew up in the Detroit suburb of Eastpointe, Michigan. Berishaj is of partial Albanian descent from his father, who is from Albania.

== Career ==
=== Before JMSN ===
While still in high school, Berishaj started a band originally called Snowhite. This group morphed into Love Arcade, which got a record label with Atlantic Records in 2005. They put out one album Love Arcade before they broke up. From 2009-2011, Berishaj released songs under the pseudonym, Christian TV. His songs 1, 2, 3 Turn Around and Victoria's Secret were included in the compilation album Girlfriend Pop in 2009, with the former also being included on the soundtrack of the 2009 film Fired Up!. Furthermore, he released the single When She Turns 18 in 2010 and the singles I'm In Love and Love 2 Baby in 2011, with When She Turns 18 and Love 2 Baby both receiving a music video.

=== 2012–2015 ===
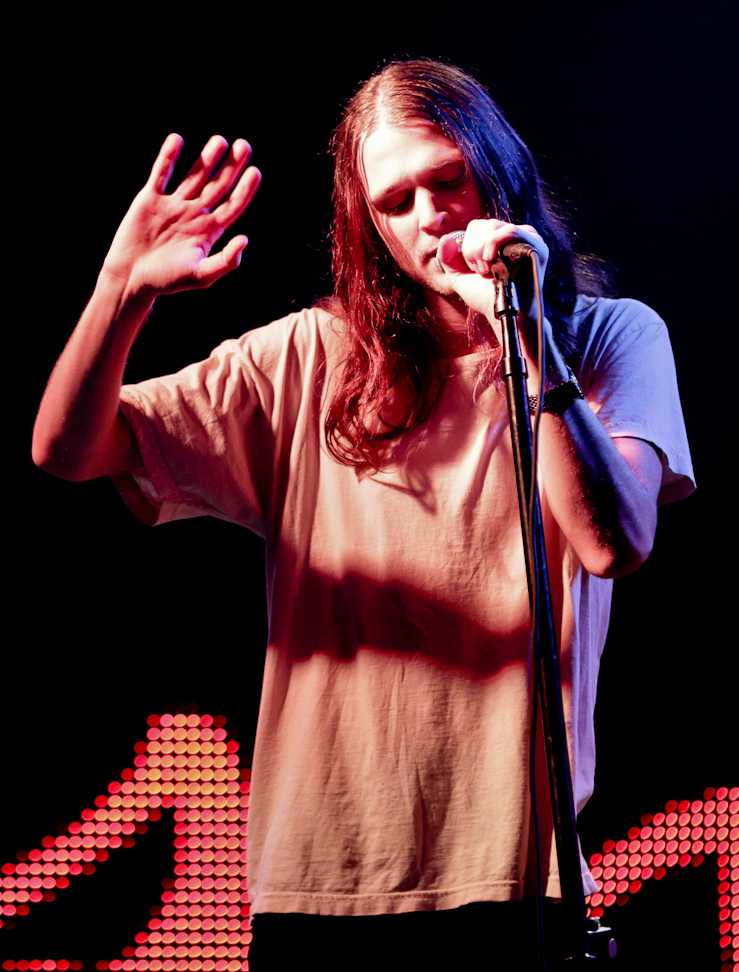
JMSN in 2012

Berishaj started his own label, White Room Records and adopted the moniker JMSN. He released his debut album, Priscilla on January 11, 2012. Berishaj wrote and produced the alternative R&B album, straying from his pop-rock/electropop roots. In the album, he pursues darker emotional themes over melancholic melodies and beats that The Guardian described as "spaced out" and compared to The Weeknd. Self-directed videos for "Alone", "Hotel" and "Something" were released to accompany the album's release, while a video for "Girl I Used to Know" was released under his previous stage name. In April, R&B singer Usher told music magazine NME that JMSN was his "favorite new act".

In August 2012, Berishaj produced "Nibiru" for West Coast rapper Ab-Soul. Subsequently, in October of the same year, Berishaj announced that he and the rapper would be releasing a collaborative project together. The lead single for Ab-Soul and JMSN's collaborative album, Unit 6, titled "You're Gone", features vocals from both artists, as well as production from Berishaj. Recently, Unit 6 was revealed to be shelved due to business disagreements which may or may not make the light of day.

After the success of Priscilla, Berishaj (as JMSN) released his album Pllaje, on November 5, 2013. This garnered him more acclaim in the community, and he gained recognition in the music industry. Berishaj began collaborating with other artists, like J. Cole and The Game, while releasing Pllaje's visuals through his YouTube channel for: "Love Myself", "The One" and "Thing U Miss". In 2013, his North American tour took him to over 20 cities where he both opened and headlined the shows.

On December 9, 2014 Berishaj released his third album The Blue Album. In 2015, he toured to promote the album.

=== 2016–present ===
On March 1, 2016, Berishaj released a soulful and jazzy single, "Cruel Intentions". The release of this song was followed by the singles: "Most of All", "Hypnotized," and a Snoh Aalegra remix of "Cruel Intentions". The first three songs were included on JMSN's third album, It Is. which was released on May 6, 2016.

In August 2016, Berishaj revealed that he is the elusive artist Pearl, shortly after dropping Pearl's new album, Closer. In a handwritten letter posted to his social media, he wrote, "I started Pearl to have another creative outlet besides JMSN. White Room Records is about freedom. Be what you want to be."

On April 28, 2017, JMSN released the album Whatever Makes U Happy on White Room Records.

On September 21, 2018, JMSN released the album Velvet on White Room Records.

On September 3, 2021, JMSN released the album Heals Me on White Room Records.

On October 11, 2023, JMSN released the album Soft Spot On White Room Records

At the end of 2024, the single and title track for his previous album, "Soft Spot", gained attention on social media through a viral snippet of the song's music video. On December 2, a remix version with the rapper Sada Baby was released.

In 2025, his 2023 song "Love Me" was memed by various Internet users, who compared it to Drake song intros.

On October 14, 2025, JMSN released the album ...it's only about u if you think it is. On White Room Records. This album would lean into Detroit rock with grunge elements.

== Artistry ==
Berishaj has cited Whitney Houston, Prince, Phil Collins, Fiona Apple, and Radiohead as influences on his music.

== Discography ==
=== Studio albums ===
List of albums, with selected chart positions
Title	Album details	Peak chart positions
Title	Album details	US Heatseekers
†Priscilla†	Released: January 11, 2012; Label: White Room Records; Format: CD, digital download, LP	—
†Pllajë†	Released: November 5, 2013; Label: White Room Records; Format: CD, digital download, LP	—
JMSN (Blue Album)	Released: December 9, 2014; Label: White Room Records; Format: CD, digital download, LP	18
It Is.	Released: May 6, 2016; Label: White Room Records; Format: CD, digital download, LP	20
Whatever Makes U Happy	Released: April 28, 2017; Label: White Room Records; Format: CD, digital download, LP	—
Velvet	Released: September 21, 2018; Label: White Room Records; Format: CD, digital download, LP	—
Heals Me	Released: September 3, 2021; Label: White Room Records; Format: CD, digital download, LP	—
Soft Spot	Released: October 11, 2023; Label: White Room Records; Format: CD, digital download, LP	—
...it's only about u if you think it is.	Released: October 14, 2025; Label: White Room Records; Format: CD, cassette, digital download, LP	—
"—" denotes a title that did not chart, or was not released in that territory.

=== EPs ===
List of extended-plays
Title	Album details
Live at Red Bull Studios EP	Released: May 14, 2013; Label: White Room Records; Format: Digital download
Love & Pain EP	Released: August 27, 2013; Label: White Room Records; Format: Digital download

=== Singles ===
==== As lead artist ====
List of singles as lead artist, showing year released and album name
Title	Year	Album
"Alone"	2011	†Priscilla†
"Love & Pain"	2012	†Priscilla†
"You're Gone" (with Ab-Soul)	2013	Unit 6
"Walk Away"	2013	†Pllajë†
"Cruel Intentions"	2016	It Is.
"Most of All"	2016	It Is.
"Hypnotized"	2016	It Is.
"Drinkin'"	2017	Whatever Makes U Happy
"Where Do U Go"	2017	Whatever Makes U Happy
"Angelica (B-Side)"	2017	Whatever Makes U Happy
"So Badly"	2018	Velvet
"Talk Is Cheap"	2018	Velvet
"Christmas Time Is Here"	2020	Non-album single
"Rolling Stone"	2021	Heals Me
"Love 2 U"	2021	Heals Me
"Cherry Pop"	2023	Soft Spot
"Love Me"	2023	Soft Spot
"Soft Spot"	2023	Soft Spot

==== As a featured artist ====
List of featuring singles, showing year released and album name
Title	Year	Album
"Make You Stay" (Kastle featuring JMSN)	2013	Kastle
"Make It Last" (Ta-ku featuring JMSN)	2013	Non-album single
"Daydreams" (Sadistik x Kno featuring JMSN)	2015	Phantom Limbs
"Getaway" (NIve featuring JMSN)	2018	Non-album single

==== Guest appearances ====
List of non-single guest appearances, with other performing artists, showing year released and album name
Title	Year	Other artist(s)	Album
"Bitch, Don't Kill My Vibe"	2012	Kendrick Lamar	Good Kid, M.A.A.D City
"The Art of Peer Pressure"	2012	Kendrick Lamar	Good Kid, M.A.A.D City
"Sing About Me, I'm Dying of Thirst"	2012	Kendrick Lamar	Good Kid, M.A.A.D City
"Real"	2012	Kendrick Lamar	Good Kid, M.A.A.D City
"Pray"	2012	Game, J. Cole	Jesus Piece
"All We Do"	2013	Kaytranada	Kaytra Todo
"Late"	2013	Beat Culture	Forgive
"Drive Fast, Live Young"	2013	Tyga	Hotel California
"Death From Above"	2013	Kastle	Kastle
"Separate"	2013	Deniro Farrar	The Patriarch II
"Affection"	2013	Sango	North
"Slo Swerve"	2013	14KT, Buff1	Nickel & Dimed
"IV"	2013	Blue Sky Black Death	Glaciers
"W.R.O.H."	2014	Ab-Soul	These Days...
"Worry"	2015	Evil Needle	Reminisce
"My Own"	2016	Domo Genesis	GENESiS
"I Believe"	2017	Ro Spit & 14KT	RSXGLD
"True"	2017	Ro Spit & 14KT, Royce da 5'9", DJ Assault	RSXGLD
"Need Your Love"	2026	AZ Chike	No Rest for the Wicked

== Videography ==
=== Music videos ===
Year	Video	Director
	"Girl I Used To Know"	JMSN
	"Hotel"	JMSN
	"Alone"	JMSN
2012	"Something"	JMSN
2012	"Fallin"	JMSN / Kenneth Brown
2012	"Let U Go" / Priscilla Trilogy	David Yarovesky
2012	"Jameson"	Green Glow Films
2014	"The One"	JMSN
2014	"Thing U Miss"	JMSN
