= M.A.A.D City =

Song by Kendrick Lamar featuring MC Eiht

from the album Good Kid, M.A.A.D City
- Released: October 22, 2012
- Recorded: 2012
- Genre: Trap; West Coast hip-hop; gangsta rap; hardcore hip-hop; G-funk
- Length: 5:50
- Label: Interscope; Top Dawg; Aftermath
- Songwriters: Kendrick Duckworth; Mark Spears; Ricci Riera; Axel Morgan; Aaron Tyler
- Producers: Sounwave; THC; Terrace Martin (add.)

Audio video
- "M.A.A.D City" on YouTube

"M.A.A.D City" (stylized as "m.A.A.d city") is a song by American rapper Kendrick Lamar, from his second studio album Good Kid, M.A.A.D City (2012). The song, which appears as the eighth track on the album, features a guest appearance from fellow Compton native and West Coast rapper MC Eiht. The song was produced by Top Dawg in-house producers THC and Sounwave for the first part of the instrumental, and Terrace Martin for the second part. The song peaked at number 75 on the Billboard Hot 100.

== Background ==
In the song, Lamar tells the story of his upbringing in Compton and its results. The song features MC Eiht of American gangsta rap group Compton's Most Wanted. The song also features additional background vocals from Lamar's Black Hippy cohort Schoolboy Q, doing his signature ad-lib "yawk" four times during the refrain. He also explained "M.A.A.D" is an acronym for "My Angels on Angel Dust". It is also known as "My Angry Adolescence Divided."

On "M.A.A.D City", Lamar talks about driving down Rosecrans Avenue in Compton, references smoking the PCP-laced blunt that he smoked in "The Art of Peer Pressure," and talks about being fired from his job as a security guard for staging a robbery. Lamar also talks about how he saw his uncle being shot at a local burger stand. The song features the violent climatic change in the Good Kid, M.A.A.D City story.

== Critical reception ==
The song was met with universal acclaim from music critics, praising the production and both rappers' performances. XXL called "M.A.A.D City" the album's "creative and cinematic climax." David Amidon of PopMatters praised the song's production saying, it "feels like Dr. Dre's The Chronic had a love child with Dr Dre's 2001. Andrew Nosnitsky of Spin described MC Eiht's appearance as show stealing. Complex named the song number 25 on their list of the 50 best songs of 2012.

== Chart performance ==
The week of the October 2012 release of Good Kid M.A.A.D City, "M.A.A.D City" debuted at number 94 on the Billboard Hot 100 due to high downloads. For unknown reasons, the track re-entered the Billboard Hot 100 on the week ending September 8, 2013, at number 98. Following Lamar's performance of the song at the 56th Annual Grammy Awards, the song re-entered the chart, reaching a new peak of number 75 on the chart.

== Live performances ==
On March 31, 2013, Lamar closed the Good Kid M.A.A.D City portion of Black Hippy's set, at Paid Dues 2013 with "M.A.A.D City". During his Good Kid M.A.A.D City World tour on July 12, 2013, Lamar performed "M.A.A.D City" in Birmingham, England while backed by a live band. Lamar also performed "M.A.A.D City" and "Money Trees" alongside Jay Rock, at the BET Experience concert at the Staples Center in Los Angeles. On September 17, 2013, Lamar performed "M.A.A.D City" on The Arsenio Hall Show, along with Schoolboy Q's single "Collard Greens". On January 28, 2014, Lamar performed "M.A.A.D City" on DJ Skee's SKEE Live. Following that, at the 56th Annual Grammy Awards, Lamar performed "M.A.A.D City" again, along with a remix to "Radioactive", in a mash-up with American rock band Imagine Dragons. Then on February 15, 2014, Lamar performed "M.A.A.D City" and "Bitch Don't Kill My Vibe" on national television, during NBA's All-Star Saturday Night. Lamar performed "M.A.A.D City" at every show on the DAMN. Tour and Big Steppers Tour. It was performed by Lamar in the Super Bowl LVI halftime show on February 13, 2022.

As a part of the 2025 Grand National Tour Lamar did with SZA, the composition of M.A.A.D City would be changed to remix and interpolate Anita Baker's song "Sweet Love". Who Lamar mentioned in the first track of his 2024 studio album GNX, "wacced out murals." This remix always followed an a capella Lamar sung with the crowd of the following track on Good Kid M.A.A.D City, Swimming Pools (Drank).

== Remixes ==
The song was sampled for American singer Cassie's debut mixtape RockaByeBaby (2013), on the song "I Know What You Want". The song was also sampled by Dominican rapper Sensato, for his mixtape La Parte 3 Del 28 (2013), on the song "Back in Business".

== Charts ==
Chart performance for "M.A.A.D City"
Chart (2012–2014)	Peak position
Canada Hot 100 (Billboard)	92
US Billboard Hot 100	75
US Hot R&B/Hip-Hop Songs (Billboard)	24
US Hot Rap Songs (Billboard)	10

== Certifications ==
Certifications for "M.A.A.D City"
Region	Certification	Certified units/sales
Australia (ARIA)	4× Platinum	280,000^{‡}
Brazil (Pro-Música Brasil)	Gold	30,000^{‡}
Denmark (IFPI Danmark)	Platinum	90,000^{‡}
Germany (BVMI)	Gold	150,000^{‡}
New Zealand (RMNZ)	3× Platinum	90,000^{‡}
United Kingdom (BPI)	Platinum	600,000^{‡}
United States (RIAA)	2× Platinum	2,000,000^{‡}
^{‡} Sales+streaming figures based on certification alone.
