= Backseat Freestyle =

Single by Kendrick Lamar

from the album Good Kid, M.A.A.D City
- Released: October 22, 2012
- Recorded: 2012
- Length: 3:32
- Label: TDE; Aftermath; Interscope
- Songwriters: Kendrick Duckworth; Chauncey Hollis
- Producer: Hit-Boy

Kendrick Lamar singles chronology
| "Fuckin' Problems" (2012) | "Backseat Freestyle" (2012) | "Poetic Justice" (2013) |

Music video
- "Backseat Freestyle" on YouTube

"Backseat Freestyle" is a song by American rapper Kendrick Lamar. It debuted on October 15, 2012 in the United Kingdom as the third single from Lamar's second studio album Good Kid, M.A.A.D City (2012). It was released in the United States with the album's release on October 22, 2012. "Backseat Freestyle" was written by Lamar and Chauncey Hollis and produced by Hollis under his stage name Hit-Boy.

The song was given critical acclaim, with many critics commending Lamar for his technical ability. The song peaked at number six on the US Billboard Bubbling Under Hot 100 and at 79 on the UK Singles Chart. It also made appearances on the Billboard Hot R&B/Hip-Hop Songs and Rap Songs charts, as well as the Belgian Ultratip chart. It was certified platinum by the Recording Industry Association of America (RIAA) in the US and gold by the British Phonographic Industry (BPI) in the UK. Since its release, it has been placed on multiple lists as one of Lamar's best songs.

Lamar, Jerome D, and Dave Free directed the video for "Backseat Freestyle", which shows a young Lamar lip sync to the lyrics while the video cuts between black and white scenes of Compton and Paris. The song has been on the set lists for several concert tours and has appeared in popular culture.

== Background ==
Hit-Boy met Kendrick Lamar a couple years before the creation of "Backseat Freestyle". After Lamar signed to Interscope Records, Hit-boy was encouraged by those he knew at Interscope to work with him. The two did several studio sessions in Las Vegas for a few days, though none of the songs created would appear on the final mix of Good Kid, M.A.A.D City. According to Hit-Boy, with one of the records they created, Lamar "couldn't get the hook right in his mind, so that song got deaded". Lamar subsequently requested more beats. When he heard the new beat that would be eventually chosen, Lamar stated "That's the one! This is going on my album". While on tour, he recorded his vocals and altered parts of the beat towards more of his liking. The track was originally produced for singer Ciara for an R&B song called "Hit Boy", though "the situation fell apart". When producing the song, Hit-Boy sampled The Chakachas' 1970 song "Yo Soy Cubano", as well as an episode from the Cartoon Network series The Powerpuff Girls.

Speaking on his delivery of his vocals, Lamar remarked how rapper Eminem influenced his "aggression" on the song.

== Composition ==
The song follows Lamar's album concept, which is a day in the life of a teenage Kendrick Lamar. The song is preceded by a short skit at the end of the previous track "Bitch, Don't Kill My Vibe", in which Lamar's friend tells him "K-Dot, get in the car, nigga, we finna roll out. Nigga, I got a pack of blacks and a beat CD; get your freestyles ready."

== Critical reception ==
The song received critical acclaim from music critics, with many focusing on Lamar's technical ability. Consequence writer Michael Madden described how Lamar uses "his technical gifts" to approach "Minaj-ian levels of animation" on the song. Jonah Bromwich of Pitchfork noted the song as a "technical showcase" with a "particularly clever" structure. Kyle Ellison of The Quietus called the song's lyrics "preposterous and brilliant". Writing for Slant Magazine, Mark Collett described it as a "scuzzy, sleazy delight" part of a "larger narrative". Martyn Young for musicOMH viewed the song as a "breathlessly exciting hard-edged cut" and complimented Hit-Boy's production as having "juddering bone shaking power" that creates "an intensely thrilling four minutes". Jaeki Cho of XXL praised how Lamar "channels multiple voices and executes crisp-clean double- and triple-time bonanza with ease." Eric Diep of Complex complimented the song's "infectious vocal sample" while Anupa Mistry of NOW Magazine appreciated the "grizzled lyricism".

Though, not all reviews from critics were positive. Kia Makarechi, writing for The Huffington Post, called it "perhaps the least introspective song" on the album and lamented it getting a video before other songs. While Jakob Dorof of Tiny Mix Tapes complimented the song's "demonically raw-throated" third verse, he opined that the song's beat gets "beyond [Lamar's] better judgment."

=== Accolades ===
"Backseat Freestyle" has been widely regarded as one of Lamar's best songs and has been ranked high by critics. In 2018, Bianca Alysse of Billboard ranked the song number six on their list of the 20 greatest Kendrick Lamar songs. Stereogum placed the song as number eight on their 2020 list, and in 2021, Rolling Stone ranked the song number three on their list of the 50 greatest Kendrick Lamar songs. In 2022, Alex Petridis of The Guardian ranked it second in his list of Lamar's greatest songs.

== Release and commercial performance ==
"Backseat Freestyle" was released as the third single from Good Kid, M.A.A.D City, debuting in the United Kingdom on Zane Lowe's BBC Radio 1 show on October 15, 2012. The song was posted on Hit-Boy's Twitter the same day. Following its single release, it entered and peaked at number 79 on the UK Singles Chart, dropping off the chart after one week. In the United States, "Backseat Freestyle" peaked at number six on the Billboard Bubbling Under Hot 100 singles chart following the release of Good Kid, M.A.A.D City on October 22, 2012. It also peaked at numbers 29 and 22 respectively on the Hot R&B/Hip-Hop Songs and Rap Songs charts. Beyond the Anglosphere, the single peaked at number 81 on the Belgian Ultratip chart.

On June 8, 2018, "Backseat Freestyle" was certified platinum by the Recording Industry Association of America (RIAA) with a 1,000,000 certified units in the US. On April 3, 2026, it was awarded a gold certification by the British Phonographic Industry (BPI) for 400,000 certified units in the UK.

== Music video ==
The music video for the song was released on January 2, 2013 and was directed by Kendrick Lamar, Jerome D, and Dave Free. Lamar stated it took "probably two months" to film because of the large amount of travel and him having "too many ideas". The black and white video shows Lamar rapping along to the lyrics while switching between footage of his hometown Compton, California and Paris, France, the latter a reference to the song's chorus. Several characters referenced in the album appear. Lamar's father is featured in a skit smoking marijuana and asking his son for his domino set, as well an appearance of recurring character "Sherane", who is seen leaning against Lamar's car twerking. Lamar explained how he just wanted "to have fun" with making the video by including skits and his father and wanted to give the audience something they wouldn't expect.

== Live performances and pop culture ==
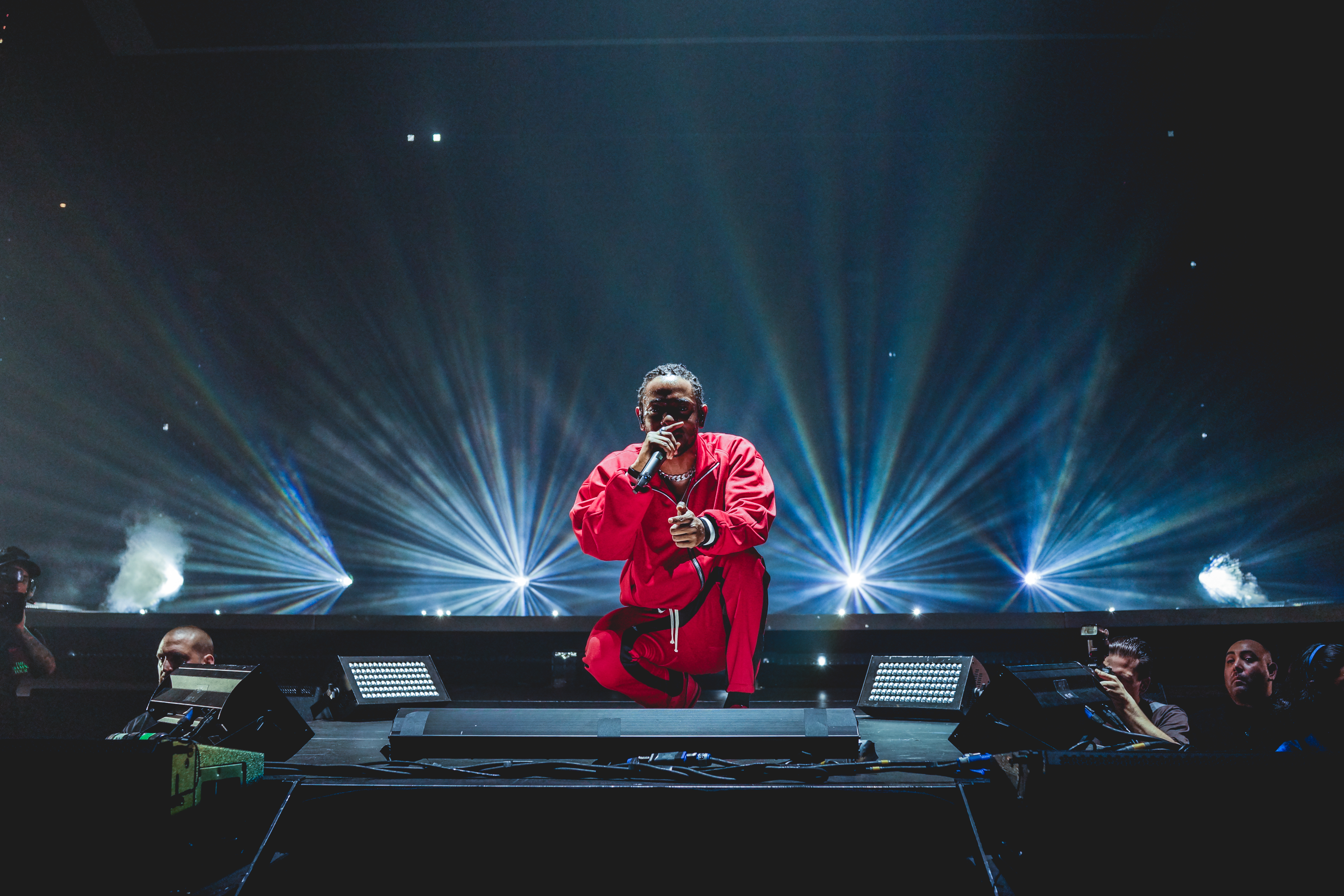
Lamar performed "Backseat Freestyle" during The Damn Tour

Lamar has frequently performed the song for concert tours as well as musical festivals. It was part of the set list for the Good Kid, M.A.A.D City World Tour, Kunta Groove Sessions Tour, The Damn Tour, The Big Steppers Tour and for The Grand National Tour It was also performed during The Championship Tour and as part of Lamar's opener for The Yeezus Tour.

The song has appeared in pop culture on occasion. In 2014, a video of Taylor Swift lip-syncing to "Backseat Freestyle" went viral and attracted considerable attention. In 2019, the song was used in the film Waves during a bonfire scene with a group of teenagers. The use of the song, along with tracks from several other high-profile artists, received media attention because of the indie nature of the film.

== Credits and personnel ==
Recording

- Recorded at TDE Red Room, Carson, California

Personnel

- Kendrick Duckworth – songwriter
- Chauncey Hollis – songwriter, producer
- Derek Ali – recording, mixing

Credits are adapted from the Good Kid, M.A.A.D City album liner notes.

== Charts ==
| Chart (2012–13) | Peak position |
|---|---|
| Belgium (Ultratip Bubbling Under Flanders) | 81 |
| UK Singles (Official Charts) | 79 |
| US Bubbling Under Hot 100 (Billboard) | 6 |
| US Hot R&B/Hip-Hop Songs (Billboard) | 29 |
| US Hot Rap Songs (Billboard) | 22 |

== Certifications ==
| Region | Certification | Certified units/sales |
|---|---|---|
| Australia (ARIA) | 2× Platinum | 140,000^{‡} |
| United Kingdom (BPI) | Gold | 400,000^{‡} |
| United States (RIAA) | Platinum | 1,000,000^{‡} |
^{‡} Sales+streaming figures based on certification alone.

== See also ==
- 2012 in hip hop music
