= Good Kid, M.A.A.D City =

Studio album by Kendrick Lamar
- Released: October 22, 2012
- Studios: At My Mama's Studio (Los Angeles); Body Music (Miami); Encore (Burbank); PatchWerk (Atlanta); TDE Red Room (Carson)
- Genres: West Coast hip-hop; gangsta rap; hardcore hip-hop
- Length: 68:23
- Labels: Interscope; TDE; Aftermath
- Producers: DJ Dahi; Hit-Boy; Jack Splash; Just Blaze; Like; Pharrell Williams; Rahki; Scoop DeVille; Skhye Hutch; Sounwave; T-Minus; Tabu; Terrace Martin; THC; Tha Bizness

Kendrick Lamar chronology
Section.80 (2011)	Good Kid, M.A.A.D City (2012)	To Pimp a Butterfly (2015)

Singles from Good Kid, M.A.A.D City
- 1. "The Recipe" Released: April 3, 2012; 2. "Swimming Pools (Drank)" Released: July 31, 2012; 3. "Backseat Freestyle" Released: January 7, 2013; 4. "Poetic Justice" Released: January 15, 2013; 5. "Bitch, Don't Kill My Vibe" Released: March 18, 2013

Good Kid, M.A.A.D City (stylized as good kid, m.A.A.d city) is the second studio album by the American rapper Kendrick Lamar. It was released on October 22, 2012, by Interscope Records, Top Dawg Entertainment and Dr. Dre's Aftermath Entertainment. The album features guest appearances from Drake, Dr. Dre, Jay Rock, Anna Wise and MC Eiht. It is Lamar's first major label album, after his independently released debut album Section.80 in 2011 and his signing to Aftermath and Interscope the following year.

Good Kid, M.A.A.D City was recorded mostly at several studios in California, with producers such as Dr. Dre, Just Blaze, Pharrell Williams, Hit-Boy, Scoop DeVille, Jack Splash, and T-Minus, among others, contributing to the album. Billed as a "short film by Kendrick Lamar" on the album cover, the concept album tells a coming-of-age story about Lamar's adolescence surrounded by the drug-infested streets and gang lifestyle of his native Compton. Good Kid, M.A.A.D City received widespread acclaim from critics, who praised its thematic scope and Lamar's lyrics. The album debuted at number two on the US Billboard 200, selling 242,000 copies in its first week – earning the highest first-week hip-hop album sales of 2012 from a male artist. It also became Lamar's first album to enter the UK Albums Chart, peaking at number 16, and entering the UK R&B Albums Chart at number two.

The album was supported by five singles – "The Recipe", "Swimming Pools (Drank)", "Backseat Freestyle", "Poetic Justice", and "Bitch, Don't Kill My Vibe". All five singles achieved chart success of varying degrees. Lamar also went on a world tour between May and August 2013, featuring the other members of the hip-hop collective, Black Hippy. The album earned Lamar seven Grammy Award nominations at the 2014 Grammy Awards, including Album of the Year. The album was also named to many end-of-the-year lists, often topping them. It was later certified triple platinum by the Recording Industry Association of America (RIAA). In 2020 and 2023, the album was ranked 115th on Rolling Stone's updated list of "The 500 Greatest Albums of All Time" and in 2022, the publication named it the greatest concept album of all time.

== Background ==
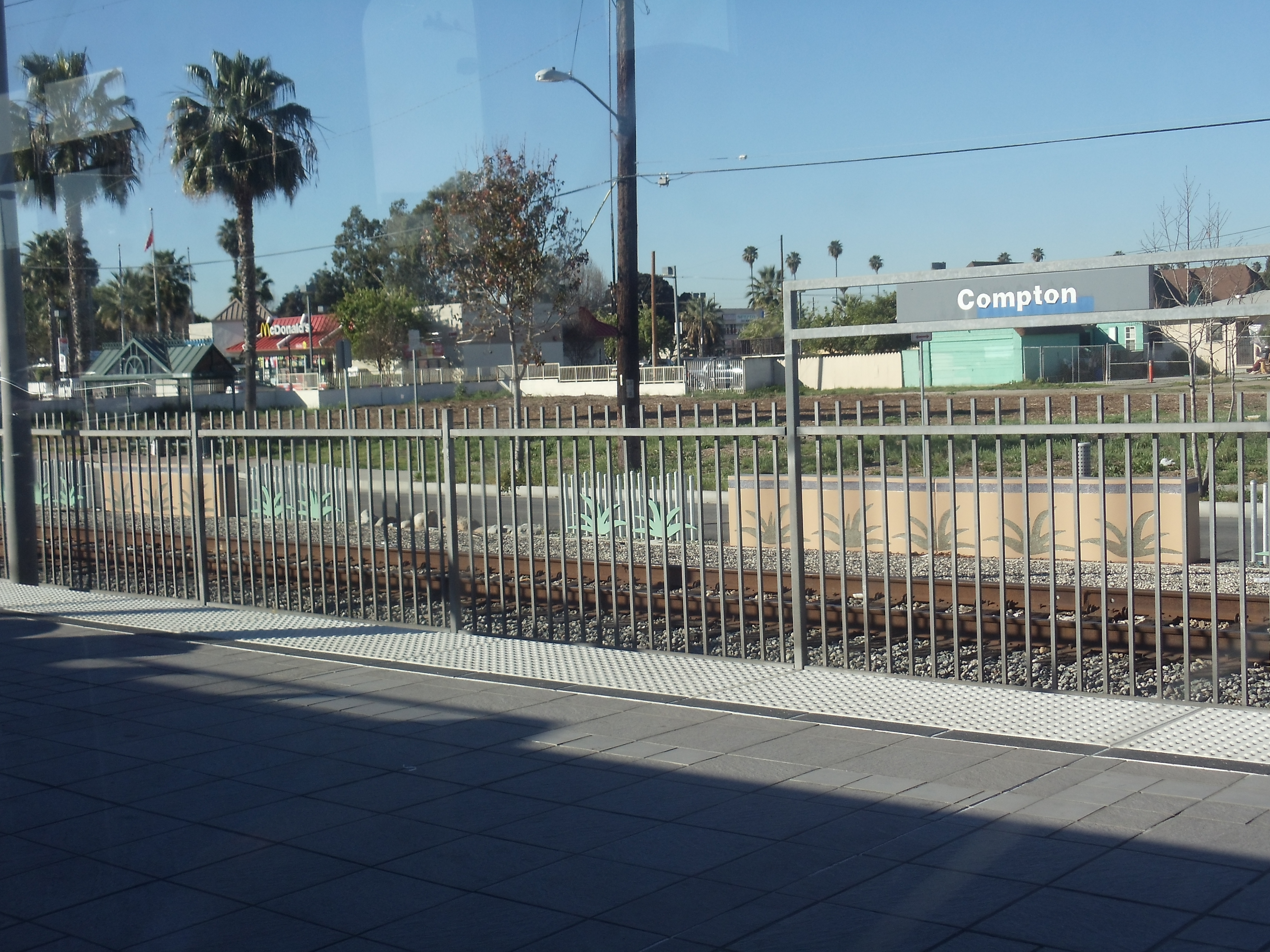
Lamar wanted to discuss life in his native city of Compton, California, in the album.

After the release and success of his debut studio album Section.80 (2011), Kendrick Lamar signed a major label record deal with Interscope Records and Dr. Dre's Aftermath Entertainment. He told HipHopDX that he did not want to work with high-profile producers, but with those he had established himself with, mainly producers from Top Dawg's in-house production team, Digi+Phonics.

In an interview for XXL, Lamar said that the album would not sound like Section.80, but will return to his Compton roots: "I couldn't tell you what type of sound or where I [will] be in the next five years as far as music... Back to the neighborhood and [going] back in that same space where we used to be, got [me] inspired. So this album won't sound like Section.80." Lamar also said that the album will showcase the influence of his hometown: "The kid that's trying to escape that influence, trying his best to escape that influence, has always been pulled back in because of circumstances that be."

== Recording and production ==
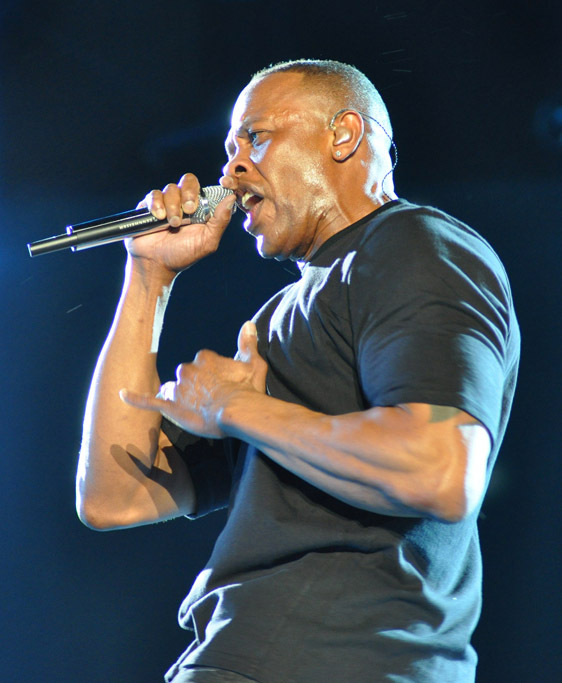
Aftermath Entertainment founder and former N.W.A member Dr. Dre was the album's executive producer.

Recording sessions for the album took place at PatchWerk Recording Studios in Atlanta, Encore Studios in Burbank, TDE Red Room in Carson, and "At My Mama's Studio" in Los Angeles. The first song that Lamar recorded for the album was "Compton", which featured Dr. Dre. The track serves as the twelfth track on the album, and acts as the standard edition's closing track.

On August 15, 2012, Lady Gaga announced via Twitter, that she had collaborated with Lamar on a song called "Partynauseous", for the album, and would be released on September 6. However, on August 23, Gaga announced that the song was no longer being released on that date and apologized to fans for the delay. Eventually, it was confirmed that Lady Gaga would not be featured on the album due to timing issues and creative differences. The song was later revealed to be re-titled "Bitch, Don't Kill My Vibe". On November 8, Gaga released the version she was featured on, which had her singing the chorus and a verse. Lamar stated he was surprised and happy that Gaga released her version of the song, as it displayed confidence in their work together.

== Music and lyrics ==
"The accuracy of its intimate autobiographical details is irrelevant—what matters is that this album helps you feel the internal struggles of a good kid who may not be good enough as he risks derailing his life by succumbing to the kneejerk loyalty, petty criminality, and gang warfare of the hood he calls home. Nobody is heroic here, including Lamar—from Christian strivers to default sociopaths, all the players are confused, weary, bored, ill-informed."

— Robert Christgau

Good Kid, M.A.A.D City has a low-key, downbeat production, with atmospheric beats and subtle, indistinct hooks. It eschews contemporary hip-hop tastes and generally features tight bass measures, subtle background vocals, and light piano. Writers draw comparisons of the music to Outkast's 1998 album Aquemini. Andrew Nosnitsky of Spin cites the music's "closest point of reference" as "the cold spaciousness of ATLiens-era Outkast, but as the record progresses, that sound sinks slowly into the fusionist mud of those sprawling and solemn mid-2000s Roots albums." Sasha Frere-Jones of The New Yorker finds its use of "smooth" music as a backdrop for "rough" scenarios to be analogous to Dr. Dre's G-funk during the early 1990s, but adds that "Lamar often sounds like Drake ... whose various dreamy styles have very little to do with the legacy of the West." Okayplayer's Marcus Moore writes that its "expansive and brooding" instrumentals eschew "California's glossy West Coast funk" for a "Dungeon Family aesthetic."

Lyrically, the album chronicles Lamar's experiences in his native Compton and its harsh realities, in a nonlinear narrative. The songs address issues such as economic disenfranchisement, retributive gang violence and downtrodden women, while analyzing their residual effects on individuals and families. Lamar introduces various characters and internal conflicts, including the contrast of his homesickness and love for Compton with the city's plagued condition. Del F. Cowie of Exclaim! observes a "transformation" by Lamar's character "from a boisterous, impressionable, girl-craving teenager to more spiritual, hard-fought adulthood, irrevocably shaped by the neighbourhood and familial bonds of his precarious environment." Slant Magazine's Mark Collett writes that Lamar executes the character's transition by "tempering the hedonistic urges of West Coast hip-hop with the self-reflective impulses of the East Coast." David Amidon of PopMatters views that the album provides a "sort of semi-autobiographical character arc", while MSN Music's Robert Christgau writes that Lamar "softspokenly" enacts a "rap-versus-real dichotomy".

The album features several naturalistic skits that portray a range of characters. Jon Caramanica of The New York Times finds them to be a part of the album's "narrative strategy", with "prayers and conversations and different voices and recollections and interludes, all in service of one overarching story: Mr. Lamar's tale of ducking Compton's rougher corners to find himself artistically." Pitchfork's Jayson Greene feels that they reinforce the album's theme of "the grounding power of family", interpreting "family and faith" to be "the fraying tethers holding Lamar back from the chasm of gang violence that threatens to consume him."

Lamar exhibits a tempered delivery on the album and raps with dense narratives, internal rhyme, double and triple time flow and multiple voices for different characters. Music journalist Jody Rosen characterizes him as "a storyteller, not a braggart or punch-line rapper, setting spiritual yearnings and moral dilemmas against a backdrop of gang violence and police brutality."

The song "Now or Never" was also chosen by LeBron James to be featured in the NBA 2K14 soundtrack.

== Title and packaging ==
Before the album's title was officially revealed, fans had already been calling Lamar's major label debut Good Kid, Mad City or Good Kid in a Mad City, as it was a nickname Lamar had given himself. He had used the phrase in his lyrics as early as the 2009 Kendrick Lamar EP. When he announced the album's title and release date, Lamar indicated that the "correct" rendering of the title is lowercase except for the two vowels in "m.A.A.d". The album's title mainly refers to Lamar's childhood innocence and how Compton affected his life. After keeping the album title's acronym concealed, Lamar later revealed M.A.A.D is an acronym with two meanings: "My Angry Adolescence Divided" and "My Angel's on Angel Dust", with Lamar stating: "That was me, [and it's] the reason why I don't smoke. It was just me getting my hands on the wrong thing at the wrong time [and] being oblivious to it." The title has been interpreted as a reference to WC and the Maad Circle, a Los Angeles-based hip-hop group active in the 1990s.

The cover artwork for Good Kid, M.A.A.D City features a child Lamar, two of his uncles, and his grandfather, with the adults' eyes censored, possibly for privacy reasons. He explained that the reason why he had not censored his own eyes was that the album's story was told through his eyes, and is based around his experiences. The uncle who is holding Lamar also is displaying the Crips gang sign with his hand, and the poster above the head of the uncle features Lamar and his father.

== Singles ==
The album's first single, "The Recipe", was released on April 3, 2012. The song featured Lamar's mentor, Dr. Dre, and was produced by Scoop DeVille. It peaked at number 38 on the US Hot R&B/Hip-Hop Songs. Lamar and Dr. Dre shot a video for the song at a mansion in Los Angeles in May, although it was never released. The album's second single, "Swimming Pools (Drank)", was released on July 31, 2012, while the music video premiered on August 3, 2012. The song became a hit, peaking at number 17 on the US Billboard Hot 100. "Swimming Pools (Drank)" was also certified gold in the United States by the RIAA.

The music video for the song, "Backseat Freestyle", was released on January 2, 2013, which included Lamar's father in a cameo appearance. It was later revealed to be released as the third single in the United Kingdom on January 7. The song peaked at number 29 on the Hot R&B/Hip-Hop Songs.

"Poetic Justice" was released as the third single in North America, and the fourth single overall, featuring Drake. The song was serviced to American rhythmic contemporary radio on January 15, 2013, and peaked at number 26 on the Billboard Hot 100. It was also soon certified gold in the United States by the RIAA.

On March 9, 2013, Kendrick told Rap-Up that his next single off the album would be "Bitch, Don't Kill My Vibe". On March 13, Young Guru premiered a snippet of the song's official remix, which featured Jay-Z. Lamar would later describe the remix as an "accomplishment to have [worked] with Jay-Z". Shortly after the remix premiered, Lamar confirmed "Bitch, Don't Kill My Vibe" would be the next single from the album. The full version of the remix was premiered by Funkmaster Flex on March 18. The remix was released as the album's fourth single to rhythmic contemporary radio on April 9. The song has since peaked at number 32 on the Billboard Hot 100. The music video for the original version of the single was released on May 13, with comedian Mike Epps making a cameo appearance. The same day, an extended version of the music video was released. It featured a cameo from Juicy J, and a bonus clip of a new song by Schoolboy Q from his own respective major label debut album, Oxymoron (2014).

On March 10, 2015, Lamar unexpectedly released the song "County Building Blues" to iTunes as a promotional single.

== Marketing and sales ==
Before and after the album's October 2012 release, Lamar toured as a supporting act alongside Drake and Steve Aoki. On May 5, 2013, he began his first headlining tour with the Good Kid, M.A.A.D City World Tour, in West Palm Beach, Florida. The tour consisted of 23 headlining shows, 22 international music festivals, and 15 United States music festivals. The tour ran through August 24, and featured other members of Black Hippy on all US dates.

After subtitling the album "a short film by Kendrick Lamar", Lamar would state in an interview with GQ that "he plans on doing a short film to bring his story to life." He also expressed interest in directing the short film, as well as suggesting that Tristan Wilds, Taraji P. Henson and Rihanna as potential names he'd want to cast in the film. On December 23, 2013, the music video for "Sing About Me", was released, and was directed by Darren Romanelli.

One week before the standard edition's release (October 22, 2012), snippets of the album leaked online. In the album's first week of release, it debuted at number two on the Billboard 200 and sold 242,000 copies in the United States. The album also entered the UK Albums Chart at number 16 on October 28, as well as entering at number two on the UK R&B Albums Chart. The album also peaked in the top ten of the album sales charts in Canada, New Zealand, and the Netherlands. In its second week, it sold 63,000 copies in the US, and 176,000 more copies over the next four weeks, bringing its total sales to 481,000 by November 25. By April 2018, the album had sold 1,720,000 copies. It was certified triple platinum by the Recording Industry Association of America (RIAA) in June; for combined sales, streaming and track-sale equivalents of three million units in the US.

On the week ending October 29, 2022, the album had spent a total of 10 years (520 weeks) on the Billboard 200, making Good Kid, M.A.A.D City the first hip-hop studio album to do so.

== Critical reception ==
Good Kid, M.A.A.D City ratings
Aggregate scores
Source	Rating
AnyDecentMusic?	8.6/10
Metacritic	91/100
Review scores
Source	Rating
AllMusic	5/5 stars
Entertainment Weekly	A−
The Guardian	4/5 stars
The Irish Times	5/5 stars
Los Angeles Times	3.5/4 stars
MSN Music (Expert Witness)	A−
Pitchfork	9.5/10
Rolling Stone	4/5 stars
Spin	8/10
USA Today	3.5/4 stars

Good Kid, M.A.A.D City was met with widespread critical acclaim. At Metacritic, which assigns a normalized rating out of 100 to reviews from professional publications, the album received an average score of 91, based on 36 reviews, indicating "universal acclaim". Aggregator AnyDecentMusic? gave it 8.6 out of 10, based on their assessment of the critical consensus. It was widely praised by reviewers for Lamar's lyrical ability and narratives.

Reviewing the album for Rolling Stone, Jody Rosen said it "warrants a place in that storied lineage" of "Seventies blaxploitation soundtracks and Nineties gangsta rap blaxploitation revivals". In the Chicago Tribune, Greg Kot applauded Lamar for giving "gangsta tropes ... a twist, or sometimes upend[ing] them completely" on a record that "brims with comedy, complexity and the many voices in Kendrick Lamar's head." Pitchfork's Jayson Greene wrote that "the miracle of this album is how it ties straightforward rap thrills" to its "weighty material" and narrative, while David Amidon from PopMatters believed the album was simultaneously accessible and substantial, capable of appealing to both underground and mainstream hip-hop listeners. Fact journalist Joseph Morpurgo called it an autobiographical "triumph of breadth" and a "wide-ranging, far-reaching success". Jaeki Cho of XXL hailed Good Kid, M.A.A.D City as "one of the most cohesive bodies of work in recent rap memory" and wrote that each song sounded "both complexly arranged and sonically fitting, foregrounding Kendrick's vivid lyricism and amazing control of cadence". In The Irish Times, Jim Carroll viewed it as an entertaining and forward-thinking that nonetheless echoed the past era of West Coast hip-hop. In the opinion of AllMusic editor David Jeffries, the album was "some kind of elevated gangsta rap"; he wrote of its subject matter:

Besides all the great ideas and life, this journey through the concrete jungle of Compton is worth taking because of the artistic richness, plus the attraction of a whip-smart rapper flying high during his rookie season. Any hesitation about the horror of it all is quickly wiped away by Kendrick's mix of true talk, open heart, open mind, and extended hand. Add it all up and subtract the hype, and this one is still potent enough to rise to the top of the pile.

Some reviewers were less enthusiastic. Hazel Sheffield of NME believed the album "might lack the raw appeal of" Section.80, while Alex Macpherson of The Guardian found "Lamar's depiction of downtrodden women" to be "unnecessarily prurient and unconvincing". Robert Christgau from MSN Music felt that its "commitment to drama has musical drawbacks", but stated, "the atmospheric beats Dr. Dre and his hirelings lay under the raps and choruses establish a musical continuity that shores up a nervous flow that's just what Lamar's rhymes need."

=== Accolades ===
Good Kid, M.A.A.D City appeared on several year-end top albums lists by music critics. It was named the best album of 2012 by BBC, Complex, Fact, New York and Pitchfork. The album was also ranked number two by Billboard, the Chicago Tribune, MTV, Spin and Time, number four by Filter, Jon Pareles of The New York Times and Ann Powers of NPR, number five by The Guardian, number six by Rolling Stone and number eight by Entertainment Weekly. In December 2012, Complex also named Good Kid, M.A.A.D City one of the 25 classic hip-hop albums of the previous 10 years. Complex also ranked its album cover as the best of 2012, while Pitchfork included it on its list of the 20 best album covers of the year. In April 2013, Vibe placed the album at number 19 on its "The Greatest 50 Albums Since '93" list. The album was also included in the book 1001 Albums You Must Hear Before You Die.

In October 2013, Complex named it the second best hip-hop album of the last five years. Also in 2013, Rolling Stone placed the album at 86 on its "The 100 Best Debut Albums of All Time" list. The album was ranked number two of "The 100 Best Albums of the Decade So Far (2010-2014)", a list published by Pitchfork in August 2014 and number five of "The 20 Best Albums of the 2010s (so far)", a list published by Billboard in January 2015. In 2020 and 2023, the album was ranked at 115 on Rolling Stone's "500 Greatest Albums of All Time" list. In 2022, it was ranked number one on Rolling Stone's "50 Greatest Concept Albums of All Time" list. In 2024, Paste ranked Good Kid, M.A.A.D City number 72 on its list of "The 300 Greatest Albums of All Time". In 2024, Apple Music ranked Good Kid M.A.A.D City number seven on its list of Apple Music 100 Best Albums. In 2025, the album was ranked at six on Rolling Stone's "Best Albums of the 21st Century So Far" list.

The album was nominated for Top Rap Album at the 2013 Billboard Music Awards and the 2013 American Music Awards, and won the award for Album of the Year at the 2013 BET Hip Hop Awards. Good Kid M.A.A.D City earned Lamar four Grammy Award nominations at the 56th Grammy Awards, for Album of The Year, Best Rap Album, Best Rap/Sung Performance for "Now or Never" with Mary J. Blige, and Best Rap Performance for "Swimming Pools (Drank)". Its loss of the Best Rap Album award to Macklemore & Ryan Lewis' The Heist was dubbed an "infamous snub" by Rolling Stone's Andre Gee. Macklemore himself deemed the loss a robbery and apologized to Lamar via iMessage.

=== Response from Shyne ===
On October 23, 2012, after Good Kid, M.A.A.D City received much critical acclaim from the hip-hop community, rapper Shyne took to Twitter to disparage the album, calling it "trash" and in particular disparaged its production. West Coast rappers Nipsey Hussle, Schoolboy Q and the Game quickly took offense to this, with the Game defending Lamar due to his "non-confrontational nature". Lamar would later respond to Shyne's comments on October 26, saying that he is not a sensitive person and was unfazed by his comments. In addition he said Good Kid, M.A.A.D City was not necessarily a "classic" as some have called it, but "classic worthy" if enough time would pass. He would later reference Shyne on the song "The Jig Is Up", stating: "I pray to God this beat good enough for Shyne". After Shyne stood by his comments, the Game responded with a freestyle calling out Shyne, entitled "Cough Up a Lung". Shyne would later respond with his own diss track in retaliation, titled "Psalms 68 (Guns & Moses)". In November 2024, Shyne expressed his regret for slamming the album on a podcast and acknowledging Lamar as "one of the greatest musicians of our generation."

=== Academic reception ===
In 2014, it was reported that Good Kid, M.A.A.D City was being studied as a text in the freshman composition class of Georgia Regents University professor Adam Diehl, alongside other coming of age works such as the James Joyce novel A Portrait of the Artist as a Young Man, Gwendolyn Brooks' Selected Poems, James Baldwin's short story "Going to Meet the Man", and the John Singleton film Boyz n the Hood. The theme of the class was meant to "inspire students to find an outlet to bring some sanity to our own mad city–Augusta", Diehl told HipHopDX. "Lamar is the James Joyce of hip-hop", he said, "in the complexity of his storytelling, in his knowledge of the canon, and in his continuing focus on the city of his upbringing—Compton."

== Track listing ==
Good Kid, M.A.A.D City standard edition
No.	Title	Writer(s)	Producer(s)	Length
1.	"Sherane a.k.a Master Splinter's Daughter"	Kendrick Duckworth; Christopher Whitacre; Justin Henderson	Tha Bizness	4:33
2.	"Bitch, Don't Kill My Vibe"	Duckworth; Mark Spears; Robin Braun^{[c]}; Vindahl Friis^{[c]}; Lykke Schmidt^{[c]}	Sounwave	5:10
3.	"Backseat Freestyle"	Duckworth; Chauncey Hollis Jr.	Hit-Boy	3:32
4.	"The Art of Peer Pressure"	Duckworth; Jonas Vestergaard; Rune Rask^{[d]}	Tabu	5:24
5.	"Money Trees" (featuring Jay Rock)	Duckworth; Johnny McKinzie Jr.; Dacoury Natche; Victoria Garance Alixe Legrand^{[e]}; Alex Scally^{[e]}	DJ Dahi	6:26
6.	"Poetic Justice" (featuring Drake)	Duckworth; Aubrey Graham; Elijah Molina; James Harris^{[f]}; Janet Jackson^{[f]}; Terry Lewis^{[f]}	Scoop DeVille	5:00
7.	"Good Kid"	Duckworth; Pharrell Williams	P. Williams	3:34
8.	"M.A.A.D City" (featuring MC Eiht)	Duckworth; Aaron Tyler; Spears; Ricci Riera; Axel "AxlFolie" Morgan	Sounwave; THC; Terrace Martin^{[b]}	5:50
9.	"Swimming Pools (Drank)" (extended version)	Duckworth; Tyler Williams	T-Minus	5:13
10.	"Sing About Me, I'm Dying of Thirst"	Duckworth; Gabe Stevenson; Derrick Hutchins; Quincy Jones^{[g]}; Alan Bergman^{[g]}; Marilyn Bergman^{[g]}	Like; Skhye Hutch; Sounwave^{[b]}	12:03
11.	"Real" (featuring Anna Wise)	Duckworth; Martin	Martin	7:23
12.	"Compton" (featuring Dr. Dre)	Duckworth; Sly Jordan; Justin Smith; Charles Richard Cason^{[h]}	Just Blaze	4:08
Total length:				68:23

Deluxe edition (bonus tracks)
No.	Title	Writer(s)	Producer(s)	Length
13.	"The Recipe" (featuring Dr. Dre)	Duckworth; Andre Young; Molina; Eric Cardona^{[i]}; Gabe D'Amico^{[i]}; Dev Gupta^{[i]}; Andrea Hernandez^{[i]}; Bryan Ujueta^{[i]}	Scoop DeVille	5:52
14.	"Black Boy Fly"	Duckworth; Columbus Smith; Dawaun Parker	Rahki; Parker^{[a]}	4:38
15.	"Now or Never" (featuring Mary J. Blige)	Duckworth; Jazmine Sullivan; Jack Splash	Splash	4:17
Total length:				87:41

iTunes deluxe edition (bonus tracks)
No.	Title	Writer(s)	Producer(s)	Length
16.	"Collect Calls" (featuring Kent Jamz)	Duckworth; Khalil Muhammad; Riera; Morgan	THC	3:57
17.	"Swimming Pools (Drank)"	Duckworth; T. Williams	T-Minus	4:07
Total length:				95:45

Target deluxe edition (bonus tracks)
No.	Title	Writer(s)	Producer(s)	Length
16.	"County Building Blues"	Duckworth; Dontae Winslow; Khalil Abdul-Rahman	DJ Khalil	4:18
17.	"Swimming Pools (Drank)" (Black Hippy remix; featuring Black Hippy)	Duckworth; Quincy Hanley; McKinzie; Herbert Stevens IV; T. Williams	T-Minus	5:14

Spotify deluxe edition (bonus tracks)
No.	Title	Writer(s)	Producer(s)	Length
16.	"The Recipe" (Black Hippy remix; featuring Black Hippy)	Duckworth; Hanley; McKinzie; Stevens; Molina; Cardona^{[i]}; D'Amico^{[i]}; Gupta^{[i]}; Hernandez^{[i]}; Ujueta^{[i]}	Scoop DeVille	4:22
17.	"Bitch, Don't Kill My Vibe" (remix; featuring Jay-Z)	Duckworth; Shawn Carter; Spears; Braun^{[c]}; Friis^{[c]}; Schmidt^{[c]}	Sounwave	4:38

2013 re-issue international (bonus track)
No.	Title	Writer(s)	Producer(s)	Length
14.	"Bitch, Don't Kill My Vibe" (international remix; featuring Emeli Sandé)	Duckworth; Adele Sandé; Spears; Braun^{[c]}; Friis^{[c]}; Schmidt^{[c]}	Sounwave	5:06

Notes

- ^{^[a]} signifies a co-producer
- ^{^[b]} signifies an additional producer
- "Bitch, Don't Kill My Vibe" features background vocals by Anna Wise and additional vocals by JMSN
- "Money Trees" features background vocals by Anna Wise
- "Good Kid" is stylized in all lowercase and features additional vocals by Chad Hugo
- "M.A.A.D City" is stylized as "m.A.A.d city" and features uncredited vocals by Schoolboy Q
- "Sing About Me, I'm Dying of Thirst" features additional vocals by JMSN, Anna Wise and Camille "ill Camille" Davis
- "Real" features background vocals by JMSN

Sample credits

- ^{^[c]} "Bitch, Don't Kill My Vibe" contains portions of "Tiden Flyver", written by Robin Braun, Vindahl Friis and Lykke Schmidt, as performed by Boom Clap Bachelors; and contains elements of the master recording "Tiden Flyver", as performed by Boom Clap Bachelors.
- "Backseat Freestyle" contains an uncredited sample of "Yo Soy Cubano", as performed by The Chakachas; and an uncredited sample from the Powerpuff Girls episode "Beat Your Greens".
- ^{^[d]} "The Art of Peer Pressure" contains a sample of "Helt Alene", written by Rune Rask, as performed by Suspekt.
- ^{^[e]} "Money Trees" contains elements and a reversed sample of "Silver Soul", written by Victoria Garance Alixe Legrand and Alex Scally, as performed by Beach House, and an uncredited interpolation of "Big Ballin' with My Homies", as performed by E-40.
- ^{^[f]} "Poetic Justice" contains excerpts from "Any Time, Any Place", written by James Harris, Janet Jackson and Terry Lewis, as performed by Janet Jackson.
- ^{^[g]} "Sing About Me, I'm Dying of Thirst" contains elements of "Maybe Tomorrow", written by Quincy Jones, Alan Bergman and Marilyn Bergman, as performed by Grant Green; and an uncredited sample of "Use Me", as performed by Bill Withers.
- ^{^[h]} "Compton" contains excerpts from "What's This World Coming To", written by Charles Richard Cason, as performed by Formula IV.
- ^{^[i]} "The Recipe" contains elements of "Meet the Frownies", written by Eric Cardona, Gabe D'Amico, Dev Gupta, Andrea Hernandez and Bryan Ujueta; and a sample of "Meet the Frownies", as performed by Twin Sister.

== Personnel ==
Credits for Good Kid, M.A.A.D City adapted from AllMusic.

- Kendrick Lamar – art direction, primary artist
- Dr. Dre – executive producer, featured artist, mixing
- Anthony "Top Dawg" Tiffith – executive producer
- Derek "MixedByAli" Ali – engineer, mixing
- Dave Free – associate producer, co-ordination
- Larry Chatman – production co-ordination
- Andrew Van Meter – production co-ordination
- Ashley Palmer – co-ordination
- Mike Bozzi – mastering
- Brian "Big Bass" Gardner – mastering
- Dee Brown – engineer
- Mike Larson – engineer
- James Hunt – engineer
- Mauricio Iragorri – engineer
- Jared Scott – engineer, mixing
- Jack Splash – producer
- Hit-Boy – producer
- Scoop DeVille – producer
- DJ Dahi – producer
- Skhye Hutch – producer
- Just Blaze – producer
- Tha Bizness – producer
- T-Minus – producer
- Pharrell Williams – producer
- Terrace Martin – additional production
- Sounwave – additional production
- Kirdis Postelle – associate producer
- Terrence Henderson – associate producer
- Drake – featured artist
- MC Eiht – featured artist
- Jay Rock – featured artist
- Kent Jamz – featured artist
- Anna Wise – featured artist, vocals, background vocals
- Camille "Ill Camille" Davis – vocals
- Chad Hugo – vocals
- JMSN – vocals, background vocals
- Amari Parnell – hooks and samples singer
- Mary Keating – violin
- Marlon Williams – guitar, bass guitar
- Charly & Margaux – violin, viola
- Gabriel Stevenson – piano
- Willie Long – grooming
- Kitti Fontaine – stylist
- Dan Monick – photography
- Paula Oliver – photo courtesy
- Dwayne LaFleur – photo courtesy
- Danny Smith – photo courtesy
- Schoolboy Q – handwriting on cover, background vocals

== Charts ==
=== Weekly charts ===
Chart performance
Chart (2012–2013)	Peak position
Australian Albums (ARIA)	23
Belgian Albums (Ultratop Flanders)	25
Belgian Albums (Ultratop Wallonia)	121
Canadian Albums (Billboard)	2
Danish Albums (Hitlisten)	20
Dutch Albums (Album Top 100)	16
French Albums (SNEP)	57
Irish Albums (IRMA)	26
New Zealand Albums (RMNZ)	7
Norwegian Albums (VG-lista)	26
Portuguese Albums (AFP)	24
Swiss Albums (Schweizer Hitparade)	38
UK Albums (Official Charts)	16
UK R&B Albums (Official Charts)	2
US Billboard 200	2
US Top R&B/Hip-Hop Albums (Billboard)	1

Chart (2017)	Peak position
Latvian Albums (LaIPA)	67

Chart (2022)	Peak position
German Albums (Offizielle Top 100)	47
UK R&B Albums (Official Charts)	1

Chart (2025–2026)	Peak position
Croatian International Albums (HDU)	40
Polish Albums (ZPAV)	21

=== Year-end charts ===
Year-end chart performance
Chart (2012)	Position
US Billboard 200	80
US Top R&B/Hip-Hop Albums (Billboard)	16

Year-end chart performance
Chart (2013)	Position
Belgian Albums (Ultratop Flanders)	190
US Billboard 200	24
US Top R&B/Hip-Hop Albums (Billboard)	7

Year-end chart performance
Chart (2014)	Position
US Billboard 200	69
US Top R&B/Hip-Hop Albums (Billboard)	27

Year-end chart performance
Chart (2015)	Position
US Billboard 200	72

Year-end chart performance
Chart (2016)	Position
Danish Albums (Hitlisten)	85
US Billboard 200	74

Year-end chart performance
Chart (2017)	Position
Danish Albums (Hitlisten)	100
US Billboard 200	60

Year-end chart performance
Chart (2018)	Position
US Billboard 200	89
US Top R&B/Hip-Hop Albums (Billboard)	61

Year-end chart performance
Chart (2019)	Position
US Billboard 200	119

Year-end chart performance
Chart (2020)	Position
Australian Albums (ARIA)	89
Belgian Albums (Ultratop Flanders)	181
US Billboard 200	86
US Top R&B/Hip-Hop Albums (Billboard)	74

Year-end chart performance
Chart (2021)	Position
Australian Albums (ARIA)	79
Belgian Albums (Ultratop Flanders)	180
US Billboard 200	53
US Top R&B/Hip-Hop Albums (Billboard)	25

Year-end chart performance
Chart (2022)	Position
Australian Albums (ARIA)	58
Belgian Albums (Ultratop Flanders)	123
Icelandic Albums (Tónlistinn)	55
New Zealand Albums (RMNZ)	24
US Billboard 200	25
US Top R&B/Hip-Hop Albums (Billboard)	12

Year-end chart performance
Chart (2023)	Position
Australian Albums (ARIA)	78
Belgian Albums (Ultratop Flanders)	140
Canadian Albums (Billboard)	49
Icelandic Albums (Tónlistinn)	64
New Zealand Albums (RMNZ)	42
US Billboard 200	30
US Top R&B/Hip-Hop Albums (Billboard)	12

Year-end chart performance
Chart (2024)	Position
Australian Albums (ARIA)	90
Australian Hip Hop/R&B Albums (ARIA)	24
Belgian Albums (Ultratop Flanders)	137
US Billboard 200	43
US Top R&B/Hip-Hop Albums (Billboard)	12

Year-end chart performance
Chart (2025)	Position
Belgian Albums (Ultratop Flanders)	134
US Billboard 200	34
US Top R&B/Hip-Hop Albums (Billboard)	8

=== Decade-end charts ===
Decade-end chart performance
Chart (2010–2019)	Position
US Billboard 200	79

== Certifications ==
Certifications
Region	Certification	Certified units/sales
Australia (ARIA)	3× Platinum	210,000^{‡}
Austria (IFPI Austria)	Platinum	20,000^{*}
Belgium (BRMA)	2× Platinum	60,000^{‡}
Brazil (Pro-Música Brasil)	Platinum	40,000^{‡}
Brazil (Pro-Música Brasil) Deluxe	Platinum	40,000^{‡}
Canada (Music Canada)	Gold	40,000^{^}
Denmark (IFPI Danmark)	2× Platinum	40,000^{‡}
Germany (BVMI)	Gold	100,000^{‡}
Italy (FIMI)	Platinum	50,000^{‡}
New Zealand (RMNZ)	7× Platinum	105,000^{‡}
Portugal (AFP)	Gold	3,500^{‡}
United Kingdom (BPI)	2× Platinum	600,000^{‡}
United States (RIAA)	3× Platinum	3,000,000^{‡}
^{*} Sales figures based on certification alone.^{^} Shipments figures based on certification alone.^{‡} Sales+streaming figures based on certification alone.

== Release history ==
Release dates and formats
Region	Date	Label(s)	Format(s)	Edition	Ref.
Various	October 22, 2012	TDE; Aftermath; Interscope	CD; digital download; LP; streaming	Standard; deluxe	
Various	October 21, 2022	TDE; Aftermath; Interscope	Cassette; CD; LP	Anniversary	

== See also ==
- List of Billboard number-one R&B albums of 2012
- List of number-one rap albums of 2012 (U.S.)
