= Sherane a.k.a Master Splinter's Daughter =

2012 song by Kendrick Lamar

Song by Kendrick Lamar

from the album Good Kid, M.A.A.D City
- Released: October 22, 2012
- Length: 4:33
- Label: Top Dawg; Aftermath; Interscope
- Songwriters: Kendrick Duckworth; Christopher Whitacre; Justin Henderson
- Producer: Tha Bizness

Audio video
- "Sherane a.k.a Master Splinter's Daughter" on YouTube

"Sherane a.k.a Master Splinter's Daughter" is a song by American rapper Kendrick Lamar, from his major-label debut studio album Good Kid, M.A.A.D City (2012), released through Top Dawg Entertainment, Aftermath Entertainment, and Interscope Records. The song was written by Lamar himself, alongside the song's producers, Tha Bizness. Upon its release, the song was positively received by music critics. Commercially, it peaked at number 42 on the US Billboard Hot R&B/Hip-Hop Songs chart.

== Background and production ==
"Sherane a.k.a Master Splinter's Daughter" delves into Lamar's experiences growing up in Compton, particularly focusing on his interactions with a girl from his past. The track was produced by Tha Bizness, a production duo consisting of Dow Jones and Henny, who had been working with Lamar since 2007. The song's creation began when Lamar was in Atlanta and received the beat from Tha Bizness. According to Lamar, he was immediately inspired by the track, which evoked memories of a specific girl from his youth. He described the writing process as natural, noting that his songs are often based on real-life experiences rather than fabricated stories.

Tha Bizness had been collaborating with Kendrick for some time, having first worked together on songs like Jay Rock's "Westside" and the inaugural Black Hippy track "Zip That, Chop That". The duo explained that when Lamar began working with them on this song, he was looking for something different and distinct. Henny noted that they used Native Instruments Maschine along with live instruments, including bass, and even incorporated experimental sounds. Kendrick was immediately drawn to the track, describing it as an anthem that captured his personal sound and vibe, reminiscent of his earlier Section.80 days.

The track's production evolved throughout the process, with several versions of the song being created before the final version appeared on the album. Top Dawg Entertainment president and rapper Punch, who assisted with the song's structure and sequencing, explained that the song initially had awkward elements in its narrative, and adjustments were made to ensure the song fit cohesively within the album.

== Critical reception ==
The song received generally positive reviews from music critics. In a review of Good Kid, M.A.A.D City, XXL praises the song for its lyrics and usage of skits, saying, "Every record is both complexly arranged and sonically fitting, foregrounding Kendrick's vivid lyricism and amazing control of cadence. There’s not a single loophole. From the prayers on 'Sherane a.k.a. Master Splinter's Daughter' to the triumphant ending on 'Compton', each skit and track interweaves one another, solidifying a complete picture".

== Charts ==
Chart performance for "Sherane a.k.a Master Splinter's Daughter"
Chart (2012)	Peak position
US Hot R&B/Hip-Hop Songs (Billboard)	42

== Personnel ==
Credits for "Sherane a.k.a Master Splinter's Daughter" adapted from Good Kid, M.A.A.D City's liner notes.

- Kendrick Lamar – vocals
- Demonterious Lawrence – bass guitar

Technical

- Dr. Dre – mixing
- Derek "MixedByAli" Ali – mixing
