= Poetic Justice (song) =

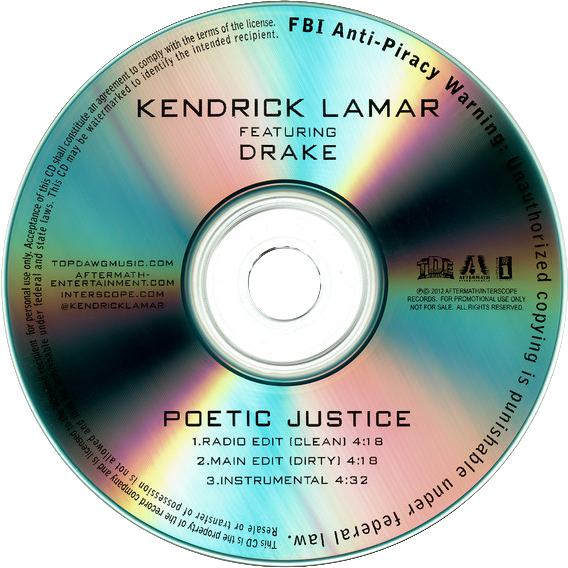
- US promotional CD single

Single by Kendrick Lamar featuring Drake

from the album Good Kid, M.A.A.D City
- Released: January 15, 2013
- Recorded: 2012
- Studio: TDE Red Room, Carson, California
- Genre: Alternative hip hop; pop rap; alternative R&B
- Length: 5:00
- Label: Top Dawg Entertainment; Aftermath; Interscope
- Songwriters: Kendrick Duckworth; Aubrey Graham; Elijah Molina; Janet Jackson; James Harris III; Terry Lewis
- Producer: Scoop DeVille

Kendrick Lamar singles chronology
"Backseat Freestyle" (2012)	"Poetic Justice" (2013)	"YOLO" (2013)

Drake singles chronology
"Lord Knows" (2012)	"Poetic Justice" (2013)	"Love Me" (2013)

Music video
- "Poetic Justice" on YouTube

"Poetic Justice" is a song by American rapper Kendrick Lamar, from his major-label debut studio album Good Kid, M.A.A.D City (2012). The song, produced by American record producer Scoop DeVille, features a verse from Canadian rapper Drake. The song was released as the album's fourth official single, due to its positive response.

== Background ==
The song was produced by Scoop DeVille, who Lamar had previously worked with on his debut single "The Recipe". DeVille sampled Janet Jackson's "Any Time, Any Place." Lamar and DeVille chose to sample the record after it came on the radio during their studio session. In an interview, DeVille recalled several artists wanting the song, including American rapper 50 Cent, before he ended up giving it to Lamar. On January 26, 2013, Lamar performed the song on Saturday Night Live, as well as his previous single "Swimming Pools (Drank)." The song's cover art feature Jackson and 2Pac, who both star in the namesake, Poetic Justice.

== Music video ==
In a December 2012 interview, Lamar stated that the music video would be filmed "soon". Although he expressed interest in having Jackson herself, who starred in the 1993 film from which the song takes its name, to appear in the video, she did not make an appearance.

The music video, directed by Kendrick Lamar under the pseudonym the Lil Homie, alongside Dee.Jay.Dave and Dangeroo Kipawaa, was released February 22, 2013. The video features cameo appearances by Lamar's fellow West Coast rappers Jay Rock, YG and Glasses Malone.

== Critical reception ==
The song garnered critical acclaim. Reviews complimented the performances of both rappers, but most of the praise went out to the sampling of Janet Jackson's hit "Any Time, Any Place". The Irish Times complimented it as one of the best tracks from Good Kid, M.A.A.D City. MTV called the song "flawless" and one of the most anticipated collaborations of the album.

While one source has identified "Poetic Justice" as a "false empowerment anthem" for East African girls due to a line in Drake's feature, Lamar has stated in an interview how aesthetic choices for the music video's production involved recognizing the "diversity of beauty" in casting.

== Remix ==
A freestyle over the song's instrumental was recorded and released by American rappers Busta Rhymes and Q-Tip on December 21, 2012, where the two pay homage to Janet Jackson.

== Commercial performance ==
The song debuted at number 76 on the Billboard Hot 100 in the album's first week on sale. It has peaked at number 26 as of March 7, 2013. It also charted at number eight on Hot R&B/Hip-Hop Songs and at number six on Hot Rap Songs. On May 9, 2013, the song was certified Gold by the Recording Industry Association of America (RIAA).

== Charts ==
=== Weekly charts ===
Weekly chart performance
Chart (2012–2013)	Peak position
Belgium (Ultratip Bubbling Under Flanders)	56
US Billboard Hot 100	26
US Hot R&B/Hip-Hop Songs (Billboard)	8
US Hot Rap Songs (Billboard)	6
US Rhythmic Airplay (Billboard)	6

=== Year-end charts ===
Annual chart rankings
Chart (2013)	Position
US Hot R&B/Hip-Hop Songs (Billboard)	23
US Rap Songs (Billboard)	16
US Rhythmic (Billboard)	31
US Streaming Songs (Billboard)	69

== Certifications ==
Region	Certification	Certified units/sales
Australia (ARIA)	2× Platinum	140,000^{‡}
Brazil (Pro-Música Brasil)	Gold	30,000^{‡}
Denmark (IFPI Danmark)	Gold	45,000^{‡}
New Zealand (RMNZ)	3× Platinum	90,000^{‡}
United Kingdom (BPI)	Gold	400,000^{‡}
United States (RIAA)	2× Platinum	2,000,000^{‡}
^{‡} Sales+streaming figures based on certification alone.

== Release history ==
Country	Date	Format	Label
United States	October 22, 2012	Rhythmic radio	Top Dawg; Aftermath; Interscope
United States	April 16, 2013	Mainstream radio	Top Dawg; Aftermath; Interscope
