= Good Kid (song) =

2012 song by Kendrick Lamar

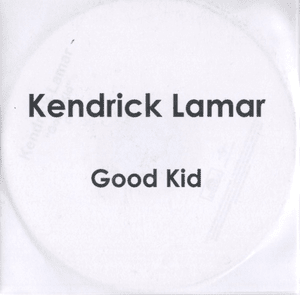

Song by Kendrick Lamar

from the album Good Kid, M.A.A.D City
- Released: October 22, 2012
- Studio: TDE Red Room (Carson)
- Genre: Gangsta rap; conscious hip-hop
- Length: 3:34
- Label: Top Dawg; Aftermath; Interscope
- Songwriter(s): Kendrick Duckworth; Pharrell Williams
- Producer(s): Pharrell Williams

Audio video
- "Good Kid" on YouTube

"Good Kid" (stylized in all lowercase) is a song by American rapper Kendrick Lamar, from his major-label debut studio album Good Kid, M.A.A.D City (2012).

== Background ==
The creation of "Good Kid" involved a dynamic and collaborative process between Kendrick Lamar and producer Pharrell Williams. The track's development began in a relaxed studio setting in Miami, where Pharrell crafted the beat from scratch. Lamar was immediately drawn to the "dramatic" nature of the instrumental. He described the initial studio sessions as "insane", noting Pharrell's rapid production skills and the ease with which they worked together. Pharrell Williams expressed his admiration for Lamar, calling him "the black Bob Dylan" and calling his lyrics "poetic" and "honest". Williams highlighted that the song offered a new perspective on Compton, compared to other portrayals by earlier artists like Dr. Dre and Snoop Dogg. The collaborative effort continued as the track was taken back to Los Angeles for further refinement, where additional vocals by Chad Hugo were added.

== Lyrics ==
"Good Kid"
Sample of "Good Kid" from Kendrick Lamar's 2012 album Good Kid, M.A.A.D. City.

"Good Kid" reflects Kendrick Lamar's experiences growing up in Compton and examines the internal conflict of navigating gang culture and systemic pressures. Kendrick Lamar described the song as a reflection of his internal struggle, capturing the tension between his moral values and the environment he was immersed in. He noted, "That represents the space I was in. Knowing that you're doing wrong things, but at the same time, you're a good kid at heart". According to MixedByAli, the track portrays the experience of an inner-city youth who is often overlooked and disrespected, particularly by law enforcement.

According to Billboard, the song tells the story of "the internal struggle within a 'good kid' trapped in the trenches of gang-banging." Vice observed a transition from Lamar's earlier persona as "K.Dot" to a more introspective and socially aware artist in the song. According to Rob Hansen of Revolt, the song encapsulates Lamar's life experiences, divided into three verses that each explore distinct challenges. Hansen describes these as "surviving the traps of the streets, being assumed as a gang member by police, [and] believing he's lost his way". XXL notes that Lamar reflects on both the allure and fear presented by gangs and police, with both parties flaunting the symbolic colors red and blue.

== Reception ==
The song received generally positive reviews from music critics. In a review of Good Kid, M.A.A.D City, Jody Rosen of Rolling Stone praises the song for its production, saying "The plush production of tracks like the Neptunes-produced centerpiece 'good kid' hearkens back to Seventies blaxploitation soundtracks and Nineties gangsta-rap blaxploitation revivals, and good kid warrants a place in that storied lineage".

== Personnel ==
Credits for "Good Kid" adapted from Good Kid, M.A.A.D City's liner notes.

- Kendrick Lamar – vocals
- Pharrell Williams – producer, vocals
- Chad Hugo – additional vocals
- Derek "MixedByAli" Ali – mixing
- Dr. Dre – mixing

== Charts ==
Chart performance for "Good Kid"
Chart (2012)	Peak position
US Hot R&B/Hip-Hop Songs (Billboard)	44
