= Compton (song) =

Promotional single by Kendrick Lamar featuring Dr. Dre

from the album Good Kid, M.A.A.D City
- Released: October 1, 2012
- Studio: Encore (Burbank); TDE Red Room (Carson)
- Genre: West Coast hip-hop; jazz rap
- Length: 4:08
- Label: TDE; Aftermath; Interscope
- Songwriters: Kendrick Duckworth; Sly Jordan; Justin Smith; Charles Richard Cason
- Producer: Just Blaze

Audio video
- "Compton" on YouTube

"Compton" is a song by American rapper Kendrick Lamar, featuring Dr. Dre, from Lamar's major-label debut album, Good Kid, M.A.A.D City (2012). Serving as the album's closing track, the song symbolizes a turning point in the narrative, representing a new chapter in Lamar's life and marking a shift from the themes of struggle and self-discovery present throughout the record. Produced by Just Blaze with contributions from Dr. Dre, "Compton" reflects both the geographic and musical identity of Lamar's hometown while incorporating a blend of modern and nostalgic production elements.

Originally conceived as a track for Dr. Dre's long-delayed Detox album, the song was later reworked for Lamar's project, becoming their first collaboration. Released as a promotional single on October 1, 2012, it was unveiled alongside the album's official tracklist. While receiving mixed-to-positive reviews from critics, "Compton" was noted for its thematic significance and production quality, serving as a celebratory ode to Lamar's hometown and his artistic journey.

== Background ==
"Compton" serves as the closing track on Good Kid, M.A.A.D City and symbolizes a turning point in the album's narrative. Kendrick Lamar described it as the beginning of a new chapter in his life, contrasting with the preceding track, "Real", which closes the story arc of the album. Lamar referred to "Compton" as "the start of positivity" in his life, marking a shift in tone from the album's themes of struggle and self-discovery.

The song holds particular significance for Lamar as it was the first track he recorded with Dr. Dre, marking the beginning of their collaboration. Lamar recalled walking into the studio for the first time and hearing the beat playing, describing the moment as unforgettable.

== Production and recording ==
The production of "Compton" was handled by Just Blaze, with contributions from Dr. Dre. Just Blaze revealed that the beat was initially created as a "skeleton" for Dre's long-delayed Detox album and later expanded for its final version on Good Kid, M.A.A.D City. He added a synth and vocoder outro to give the track a sense of closure and thematic weight. The producer aimed to create a record that reflected both the geographic and musical identity of Compton while maintaining his own production style.

The track underwent several revisions during its development, with Dr. Dre enlisting multiple writers and piecing together ideas to determine its direction. When Detox was postponed, Dre repurposed the track for a collaboration with Lamar after hearing the verses Lamar contributed.

Dre's work ethic also played a role in shaping the track, influencing Lamar's approach to his own craft. According to Punch, president of Top Dawg Entertainment, Dre's attention to detail and dedication to perfecting every aspect of the song left a lasting impression on Lamar, further reinforcing his commitment to artistic quality.

== Lyrics ==
The lyrics of "Compton" serve as an ode to Kendrick Lamar's hometown, celebrating the city while reflecting on his journey and growth. As noted by Billboard, it represents Lamar's tribute to the city that shaped him, delivered alongside Dr. Dre, who is portrayed as passing "the torch" to him. Vice's Bassil Ryan highlighted the track as being told from the perspective of a "resurrected Kendrick Lamar", signifying his liberation from the struggles and constraints of his environment.

== Release ==
"Compton" was released as a promotional single from Good Kid, M.A.A.D City, on October 1, 2012, less than three weeks before the album's release. The song premiered alongside the unveiling of the album's official tracklist and marked Lamar's second collaboration with Dr. Dre, following their earlier single, "The Recipe". Punch advocated for including the song early in the album's rollout and wanted it to be released before "The Recipe". "Compton" peaked at number two on the US Billboard Bubbling Under R&B/Hip-Hop Singles chart, which serves as an extension of the primary chart.

== Critical reception ==
"Compton" received a mixed-to-positive response from critics. Andrew Nosnitsky of Spin described the track as "sounding like a misplaced circa-2003 New York mix-show staple" due to its Just Blaze production but praised its conclusion, stating it "makes a welcome dissolve into a DJ Quik-inspired talkbox vamp". The review further noted that while the track "felt a little dull" when released as a standalone single, it became "an apt curtain call" within the album's larger narrative.

== Personnel ==
Credits for "Compton" adapted from Good Kid, M.A.A.D City's liner notes.

- Kendrick Lamar – vocals
- Dr. Dre – vocals

Technical

- Just Blaze – production
- Dr. Dre – mixing

== Charts ==
Weekly chart performance for "Compton"
Chart (2012)	Peak position
US Bubbling Under R&B/Hip-Hop Singles (Billboard)	2
