= Seth Anderson =

Seth Anderson may refer to:

- Seth Anderson, American musician with the group Love Arcade
- Seth Anderson (One Life to Live), character on the television soap opera One Life to Live
- Seth Anderson, character in the episode "I've Got You Under My Skin" of the series Angel
