= No Rest for the Wicked (AZ Chike album) =

Studio album by AZ Chike
- Released: September 18, 2026
- Genre: West Coast hip-hop
- Length: 41:22
- Label: Warner
- Producers: 1mtha1; As If!; Bongo on the Beat; Noah Ehler; Jordan Elgie; Hit-Boy; IsThatTrey; Low the Great; M-Tech; Terrace Martin; Taylor McFerrin; Sean Momberger; Sounwave; Tyler, the Creator; Pharrell Williams

AZ Chike chronology
Don't Die Yet (2024)	No Rest for the Wicked (2026)

Singles from No Rest for the Wicked
- 1. "Packed Up" Released: June 11, 2026; 2. "Look Like My Mama" Released: August 28, 2026

No Rest for the Wicked is the seventh studio album by the American rapper AZ Chike. His first album with a major record label, it was released through Warner Records on September 18, 2026.

The album was preceded by the release of the singles "Packed Up" and "Look Like My Mama" featuring Tyler, the Creator, and was reportedly co-executive produced by Kendrick Lamar.

== Background and composition ==
On 21 February 2025, AZ Chike released "Whatx2" as a single along with its music video, simultaneously announcing his signing to Warner Records.

On 10 September 2025, he was featured on Kai Cenat's Mafiathon 3 Freestyle, where he rapped over an untitled instrumental later to be revealed the one for "Hit A Nerve". On 14 November 2025, AZ Chike released the single "Hit A Nerve", along with a music video on YouTube, in which he promoted his upcoming album titled N.R.F.T.W., which was labeled multiple times through the video.

In June 2026, he released the single "Packed Up", produced by Hit-Boy, along with a music video.

In August 2026, he announced the single "Look Like My Mama" featuring Tyler, the Creator, and revealed the album cover for his album No Rest for the Wicked, abbreviated N.R.F.T.W., set to release on September 18th of the same year. "Look Like My Mama" was released on August 28th, along with a music video directed by Stacking Memories, reenacting scenes from different films, including Napoleon Dynamite (2004), Dead Presidents (1995), Paid in Full (2002), Sinners (2025), and Men in Black (1997). AZ Chike will headline his first solo tour in support of the album, the Monster Energy-sponsored No Rest for the Wicked Tour will last from October 5 until November 9.

The album consists of fourteen tracks written by the rapper himself with numerous authors and producers, including Bongo on the Beat, Hit-Boy, Nick Hakim, Pharrell Williams, Sean Momberger, Sounwave, Terrace Martin, and Tyler, the Creator, among others, it also includes three collaborations: one with JMSN, and two with Tyler, the Creator.

== Critical reception ==
Professional ratings
Review scores
Source	Rating
Pitchfork	7.5/10
Shatter the Standards	4/5

Upon its release, No Rest for the Wicked received a generally favorable reviews. Writer Andre Gee from Pitchfork called the album "proof of the maxim that it takes 10 years to become an overnight sensation... show[ing] off his versatility and knack for hooks on an album that effortlessly balances fury, swagger, and introspection."

== Track listing ==
No Rest for the Wicked track listing.
No.	Title	Writer(s)	Producer(s)	Length
1.	"Mercy"	Damaria Walker; Asif Khan "As If!" Saddique	As If!	2:53
2.	"Lamb Truck Keys"	Walker; Pharrell Williams	Williams	2:32
3.	"Sky Rockets"	Walker; Taylor McFerrin; Terrace Martin	McFerrin; Martin	3:30
4.	"God's Favorite"	Walker; Von'Trey "IsThatTrey" Taylor; Deangelo "Low the Great" Smith	IsThatTrey; Low the Great	3:08
5.	"Need Your Love" (featuring JMSN)	Walker; Christian Berishaj; Uforo Ebong	Bongo on the Beat	3:08
6.	"Look Like My Mama" (with Tyler, the Creator)	Walker; Tyler Okonma; Phillip Pitts; Teraike Crawford; Curtis Jackson	Tyler, the Creator	3:16
7.	"Are You Tired Yet?"	Walker; Matthew Douglas "M-Tech" Bernard	M-Tech	0:27
8.	"Wonder"	Walker; Jordan Elgie; Bernard; Noah Ehler; Mark Spears	Elgie; M-Tech; Ehler; Sounwave	3:49
9.	"Negative"	Walker; Spears; Nick Hakim	Sounwave; Hakim^{[c]}	2:23
10.	"Packed Up"	Walker; Chauncey Hollis, Jr.	Hit-Boy	2:20
11.	"Uncomfortable Conversations"	Walker; Siddique; Sean Momberger	As If!; Momberger	3:14
12.	"The World Is Ours" (with Tyler, the Creator)	Walker; Okonma	Tyler, the Creator	2:54
13.	"Rock Bottom"	Walker; Hollis, Jr.	Hit-Boy	2:57
14.	"Hateful + Ungrateful"	Walker; Alexander "1mtha1" Hornick; Bernard; Momberger	1mtha1; M-Tech; Momberger	3:55
Total length:				41:22

=== Note ===
- ^{^[c]} indicates a co-producer

== Personnel ==
Credits are adapted from Tidal.

- AZ Chike – vocals
- Derek "MixedByAli" Ali – mixing
- Nicolas De Porcel – mastering
- Demitrius Lewis II – mastering assistance (6)
- As If! – engineering (1)
- Jeremy Dilli – engineering (2)
- Hayden Duncan – engineering (3, 7, 8, 11, 12, 14)
- Spencer Anderson – engineering (4)
- Ian Rene – engineering (5)
- Gerald Figueroa – engineering (6, 10, 13)
- Ray Charles Brown Jr. – engineering (9)
- Danyal Ahmed – engineering assistance (1)
- Naif Alkhamri – engineering assistance (1)
- Mitchell Galves – engineering assistance (2, 9, 11)
- Garrett Duncan – engineering assistance (3, 4, 8, 9)
- Ivan Marcelo – engineering assistance (3, 5, 8, 12)
- Danforth Webster – engineering assistance (3, 8)
- Ashley Wearren – engineering assistance (9)
- Rosegold – vocals (3)
- JMSN – vocals (5)
- Tyler, the Creator – vocals (6, 12)
- Lazā – vocals (7)

== Charts ==
Chart performance for No Rest for the Wicked
Chart (2026)	Peak position
UK Album Downloads (Official Charts)	92
