= Swimming Pools (Drank) =

Single by Kendrick Lamar

from the album Good Kid, M.A.A.D City
- B-side: "Remixes" (12")
- Released: July 31, 2012
- Recorded: 2012
- Genre: Hip-hop
- Length: 4:07 (single version); 5:13 (extended version)
- Label: Top Dawg; Aftermath; Interscope
- Songwriters: Kendrick Duckworth; Tyler Williams
- Producer: T-Minus

Kendrick Lamar singles chronology
| "The Recipe" (2012) | "Swimming Pools (Drank)" (2012) | "Fuckin' Problems" (2012) |

Music video
- "Swimming Pools (Drank)" on YouTube

Audio sample
- A sample of the song, the line before the chorus says Kendrick takes a few sips then a very inebriated man says he needs to "Get a swimming pool full of liquor and dive in it".: file; help

"Swimming Pools (Drank)" is a song by American rapper Kendrick Lamar. It was released on July 31, 2012, as the lead single (second overall) from his major-label debut studio album Good Kid, M.A.A.D City (2012), by Top Dawg Entertainment (TDE), Aftermath and Interscope. The song was written by Lamar and Tyler "T-Minus" Williams, the latter of whom also produced the song. The song, mixed by Aftermath label boss Dr. Dre and Top Dawg's in-house engineer Derek "MixedByAli" Ali, propelled Lamar to mainstream popularity. The song peaked at number 17 on the US Billboard Hot 100, in its thirteenth week of charting, after gradually climbing up the chart. It debuted at number 100, and progressed from number 55 and 32 to its peak. "Swimming Pools (Drank)" also serves as Lamar's first entry on the UK Singles Chart, where it debuted at number 63.

A music video was released to accompany the song in August 2012. It was featured in the 2013 game Saints Row IV, the 2014 re-release of the game Grand Theft Auto V, and on a 2013 episode of Grey's Anatomy. On January 26, 2013, Lamar performed the song along with the third single "Poetic Justice" on Saturday Night Live. The music video was nominated for Best Male Video and Best Hip-Hop Video at the 2013 MTV Video Music Awards. The song was later nominated for Best Rap Performance at the 56th Annual Grammy Awards.

== Composition ==
The single is an introspective regarding Lamar's family and social life, alcoholism, and the peer pressure that accompanies it amongst his friends. In the first verse, he remembers his grandfather's drinking and resulting death, and the reasons that led Lamar himself to drinking.

== Critical reception ==
The song garnered acclaim from music critics upon its release. Rolling Stone ranked the song the 34th best of 2012. XXL named it one of the top five hip hop songs of 2012.

== Live performances ==
Lamar performed "Swimming Pools (Drank)" at every show on The Damn Tour.

== Chart performance ==
In its first week of release, the song debuted at number 100 on the Billboard Hot 100 and remained within the chart for another week then fell, but two weeks later re-entered the Hot 100 and climbed up each week, progressing from the top 90 to number 81, 71 and 61. In its tenth week, "Swimming Pools (Drank)" climbed up to number 55 and the following week, entered the top 40 of the Hot 100 at number 32, moving up to 25 and peaking at number 17. On the UK Singles Chart, the song entered at number 63, remaining in the top 100 for one week. The song is Lamar's sixth highest-charting solo single on the Billboard Hot 100 behind "DNA." which debuted and peaked at number four and "HUMBLE." which debuted at number two and peaked at number one (though his features on "Fuckin' Problems" and "Bad Blood" reached the top 10 in the United States) and on the UK Singles Chart.

== Music video ==
The music video, directed by Jerome D, premiered August 3, 2012 on 106 & Park. A review by the magazine Rolling Stone shared a summary of the video stating: "In his new video for 'Swimming Pools (Drank),' Kendrick Lamar defies gravity, floating and tumbling in suspended space as liquor bottles fly upwards and smash into the ceiling. The rapper gets introspective on a woozy beat, considering the highs and lows of alcohol consumption and the sense of confidence it bestows upon the drinker. Lamar spends most of the video rapping alone, but color-filtered shots of a booze-soaked rager poke through the more contemplative scenes."

== Track listing ==
Digital single
| No. | Title | Writer(s) | Producer(s) | Length |
|---|---|---|---|---|
| 1. | "Swimming Pools (Drank)" | Kendrick Lamar; Nikhil Seetharam; Tyler Williams | T-Minus | 4:07 |

good kid, m.A.A.d city
| No. | Title | Writer(s) | Producer(s) | Length |
|---|---|---|---|---|
| 9. | "Swimming Pools (Drank)" (Extended Version) | Kendrick Lamar; Nikhil Seetharam; Tyler Williams | T-Minus | 5:13 |

good kid, m.A.A.d city (deluxe edition)
| No. | Title | Writer(s) | Producer(s) | Length |
|---|---|---|---|---|
| 17. | "Swimming Pools (Drank)" (Main Version) | Kendrick Lamar; Nikhil Seetharam; Tyler Williams | T-Minus | 4:07 |
| 19. | "Swimming Pools (Drank)" (Black Hippy Remix) | Lamar; Williams; Herbert Stevens IV; John McKinzie; Quincy Hanley | T-Minus | 5:14 |

== Remixes ==
The official remix featuring his Black Hippy cohorts – Ab-Soul, Jay Rock and Schoolboy Q was included as a bonus track on the Target deluxe edition of Good Kid, M.A.A.D City. On March 14, 2013, producer Dev Hynes uploaded a reinterpreted rendition of the track by British girl group, Sugababes to his official SoundCloud page. The track, entitled "Lay Down in Swimming Pools", features an interpolation of the original Lamar song. Hynes later commented saying: "Just finished recording new music with Mutya, Keisha and Siobhan, and the girls felt like having a bit of fun at the end of the last session – enjoy!!". The song was later rearranged for their 2022 album release The Lost Tapes. In 2023, Tori Amos' cover of the track was included in Trevor Horn's album Echoes: Ancient and Modern.

== Charts ==
=== Weekly charts ===
| Chart (2012–2013) | Peak position |
|---|---|
| Australia (ARIA) | 67 |
| Belgium (Ultratip Bubbling Under Flanders) | 19 |
| Belgium (Ultratip Bubbling Under Wallonia) | 43 |
| Canada Hot 100 (Billboard) | 99 |
| France (SNEP) | 59 |
| UK Singles (Official Charts) | 57 |
| UK Hip Hop/R&B (Official Charts) | 11 |
| US Billboard Hot 100 | 17 |
| US Adult R&B Songs (Billboard) | 39 |
| US Hot R&B/Hip-Hop Songs (Billboard) | 3 |
| US Hot Rap Songs (Billboard) | 3 |
| US Rhythmic Airplay (Billboard) | 4 |

| Chart (2025) | Peak position |
|---|---|
| Global 200 (Billboard) | 186 |

=== Year-end charts ===
| Chart (2012) | Position |
|---|---|
| US Hot R&B/Hip-Hop Songs (Billboard) | 90 |
| US Rap Songs (Billboard) | 48 |
| Triple J Hottest 100, 2012 | 71 |
| Chart (2013) | Position |
| US Billboard Hot 100 | 79 |
| US Hot R&B/Hip-Hop Songs (Billboard) | 17 |
| US Rhythmic (Billboard) | 27 |

== Certifications ==
| Region | Certification | Certified units/sales |
|---|---|---|
| Australia (ARIA) | 8× Platinum | 560,000^{‡} |
| Austria (IFPI Austria) | Platinum | 30,000^{*} |
| Brazil (Pro-Música Brasil) | Platinum | 60,000^{‡} |
| Canada (Music Canada) | 8× Platinum | 640,000^{‡} |
| Denmark (IFPI Danmark) | 2× Platinum | 180,000^{‡} |
| Germany (BVMI) | Platinum | 600,000^{‡} |
| Italy (FIMI) | Gold | 50,000^{‡} |
| New Zealand (RMNZ) | 6× Platinum | 180,000^{‡} |
| United Kingdom (BPI) | 2× Platinum | 1,200,000^{‡} |
| United States (RIAA) | 4× Platinum | 4,000,000^{‡} |
^{*} Sales figures based on certification alone.^{‡} Sales+streaming figures based on certification alone.

== Release history ==
| Country | Date | Format | Label | Ref. |
|---|---|---|---|---|
| United States | July 31, 2012 | Digital download; streaming | Aftermath; Interscope | |
| United States | August 21, 2012 | Rhythmic airplay | Aftermath; Interscope | |
| United Kingdom | September 30, 2012 | Digital download; streaming | UMG | |
| United States | January 22, 2013 | Mainstream airplay | Interscope | |
