= Look Like My Mama =

Single by AZ Chike featuring Tyler, the Creator

from the album No Rest for the Wicked
- Released: August 28, 2026
- Genre: West Coast hip-hop
- Length: 3:16
- Label: Warner
- Songwriters: Damaria Walker; Tyler Okonma; Phillip Pitts; Teraike Crawford; Curtis Jackson
- Producers: Tyler, the Creator

AZ Chike singles chronology
"Packed Up" (2026)	"Look Like My Mama" (2026)

Tyler, the Creator singles chronology
"Sag Harbor" (2026)	"Look Like My Mama" (2026)

Music video
- "Look Like My Mama" on YouTube

"Look Like My Mama" is a song by American rapper AZ Chike featuring fellow American rapper Tyler, the Creator. It was released on August 28, 2026, as the second single from AZ Chike's seventh studio album, No Rest for the Wicked (2026). The song was produced by Tyler, the Creator, and samples vocals from "Disco Inferno" by 50 Cent.

== Composition ==
The song features a West Coast-influenced beat. It has no chorus, with AZ Chike and Tyler, the Creator alternating verses throughout the track.

== Critical reception ==
Writing for HotNewHipHop, Alexander Cole lauded the song, remarking "Both artists drop dope verses throughout the track. AZ Chike's flow is always infectious, and that comes through on this latest effort." Tom Breihan of Stereogum called it an "extremely fun new back-and-forth shit-talk session."

== Music video ==
The music video, directed by Stacking Memories, was released alongside the single. In the clip, the rappers reenact scenes from the films Napoleon Dynamite, Dead Presidents, Paid in Full, Sinners, and Men in Black.

== Charts ==
Chart performance for "Look Like My Mama"
Chart (2026)	Peak position
US Bubbling Under Hot 100 (Billboard)	25
US Hot R&B/Hip-Hop Songs (Billboard)	41
US Rhythmic Airplay (Billboard)	22
