= Love Arcade =

American band

- Origin: St. Clair Shores, Michigan, United States
- Genres: Power pop, alternative rock, indie pop
- Years active: 2005–2008
- Label: Atlantic
- Past members: Christian Berishaj; Seth Anderson; Samuel Anderson; Tony Sliwinski; Dorman Pantfoeder; Thomas Amason; Nathaniel Boone

Love Arcade was an American alternative/powerpop band founded by Christian Berishaj. Their debut album, Love Arcade was released in 2006.

== History ==
Berishaj received a guitar from his father in fourth grade. Berishaj started working on Pro Tools at the age of twelve. He began writing songs which he recorded at home. He also learned how to play other instruments and began holding neighborhood garage performances with a band, Snowhite, he formed with bass guitarist Seth Anderson, drummer Samuel Anderson and guitarist Tony Sliwinski. Berishaj had taught Seth how to play the bass guitar. Eventually, he began mailing demos and performance videos to record labels, having his mother cold call A&R representatives. By eighteen, Berishaj had written and recorded a whole album, Love Arcade, on which he plays all the instruments.

He secured a recording contract with Atlantic Records, after turning down an offer from Sony Records, along with his band in 2005. His demos had impressed David Wimmer and Leslie Dweck of Atalantic, who were taken by Berishaj's drive and ambition. Six months later, Samuel and Sliwinski were replaced by Dorman Pantfoeder and Thomas Amason from Jacksonville, Florida at the advice of Wimmer. A keyboardist, Nathaniel Boone was added later. Love Arcade was released in 2006 with the band credited as Love Arcade. Sometime between 2006 and 2010, the band broke up.

== Artistry ==
Berishaj wrote and performed all the songs on Love Arcade while the other members served as the touring band only, not performing on the record.

== Members ==
=== Former ===
- Christian Berishaj
- Seth Anderson - bass guitar
- Samuel Anderson - drums
- Tony Sliwinski - guitar
- Dorman Pantfoeder - drums
- Thomas Amason - guitar
- Nathaniel Boone - keyboards

== Discography ==
=== Studio albums ===
- 2006 Love Arcade
