= Mr Twin Sister =

American pop band

- Origin: New York City, New York, U.S.
- Genres: indie pop, chillwave, dream pop, electronic, psychedelic pop
- Years active: 2008–present
- Labels: Infinite Best; Double Six; Domino
- Members: Eric Cardona; Gabe D'Amico; Andrea Estella; Udbhav "Dev" Gupta; Bryan Ujueta
- Website: mrtwinsister.com

Mr Twin Sister, formerly known as Twin Sister, is an American band from New York City. Their music has been described as chill wave, indie pop, dream pop, and disco. They have been compared to Cocteau Twins and Portishead. They have toured the US and Europe.

The band members are singer Andrea Estella, keyboardist Dev Gupta, bassist Gabel D'Amico, guitarist-singer Eric Cardona, and drummer Bryan Ujueta.

== History ==
The band formed in 2008 when the five members of Twin Sister came together to work on Vampires With Dreaming Kids. They relocated to Brooklyn where they built a small following. Their EP Color Your Life was released on Domino Records in the UK and Infinite Best in the USA.

Their song "All Around And Away We Go" was voted No. 59 in the 2010 Pitchfork Media tracks of the year poll and they were voted at No. 3 in the Best Hope for 2011 section of the readers poll.

The 2012 hip-hop hit "The Recipe" by Kendrick Lamar, featuring Dr. Dre and produced by Scoop Deville, sampled Twin Sister's song "Meet the Frownies", as did the 2023 drift phonk song "LOVELY BASTARDS" by yatashigang and ZWE1HVNDXR.

In 2014, the band changed their name from Twin Sister to Mr Twin Sister, following legal threats from the similarly-named 1970s band Twin Sisters.

Andrea Estella replaced Leighton Meester as Carrie Bishop in the Kickstarter-funded film Veronica Mars, released in 2014.

== Discography ==
=== Studio albums ===
- In Heaven (September 27, 2011)
- Mr Twin Sister (September 23, 2014)
- Salt (October 25, 2018)
- Al Mundo Azul (November 19, 2021)

=== EPs ===
- Vampires With Dreaming Kids (November 1, 2008)
- Color Your Life (March 30, 2010)
- Split (with The Luyas) (April 16, 2011)
- Upright And Even (October 28, 2022)

=== Compilation Albums ===
- Alternates (March 13, 2010)
- Mr Twin Sister (Demos, Outtakes, B-Sides) (September 23, 2024)

=== Singles ===
- Bad Street (September, 2011)
- Kimmi In a Rice Field / Bad Street Remixes (December, 2011)
- The Erotic Book (May, 2015)
- Poor Relations (November, 2016)
- Jaipur (June, 2018)
- Power of Two / Echo Arms (August 24, 2018)
- Diary / Expressions (February, 2021)
- Polvo (September, 2021)
- Ballarino (October, 2021)
- Beezle (November, 2021)
- Re-sort (November, 2022)

=== Eric Cardona’s Solo Work ===
- Cell Songs (Album, February 2019)
- Two Moons (Single, March 2019)
