= The Recipe (song) =

2012 single by Kendrick Lamar featuring Dr. Dre

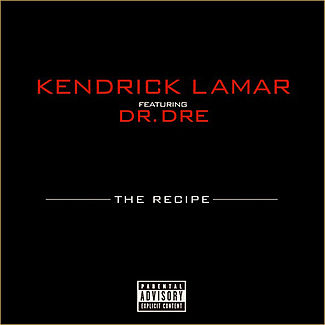

Single by Kendrick Lamar featuring Dr. Dre

from the album Good Kid, M.A.A.D City (Deluxe edition)
- Released: April 3, 2012
- Genre: West Coast hip-hop
- Length: 5:52
- Label: Top Dawg; Aftermath; Interscope
- Songwriters: Kendrick Duckworth; Andre Young; Elijah Molina; Gabe D'Amico; Eric Cardona; Andrea Estella; Udbhav Gupta; Bryan Ujueta
- Producer: Scoop DeVille

Kendrick Lamar singles chronology
"Hood Gone Love It" (2011)	"The Recipe" (2012)	"Swimming Pools (Drank)" (2012)

Dr. Dre singles chronology
"I Need a Doctor" (2011)	"The Recipe" (2012)	"New Day" (2012)

Music video
- "The Recipe" on YouTube

"The Recipe" is a song by American rapper Kendrick Lamar. It was released on April 3, 2012, as the first single from his major label debut Good Kid, M.A.A.D City (2012). The song, however, only made the deluxe edition of the album.

The song, produced by West Coast record producer Scoop DeVille, features a guest appearance from Lamar's mentor, record producer and rapper Dr. Dre, who also mixed the record alongside Top Dawg's engineer MixedByAli.

== Background ==
On March 30, 2012, after speaking on his newly signed joint venture deal, which brought Top Dawg Entertainment alongside Aftermath Entertainment and Interscope Records for Kendrick Lamar's releases, Lamar announced on Big Boy's Neighborhood that he would premier his debut single "The Recipe", to the morning radio show on April 2. The song heavily samples "Meet the Frownies" as performed by Mr Twin Sister.

== Reception ==
The song has been well received by fans and critics alike. Carrie Battan of Pitchfork summarized the song as an "anthemic Californian pride cut". Nick Catucci of Rolling Stone jokingly wrote "You might get a contact high from this" and went on to write "Lamar’s wafting number has rolling boulders for a beat, lines about sunlight slanting through shades and Dre explaining, 'How many ways am I killin' 'em? Shit, right around a billion.'"

== Music video ==
On May 30, 2012, Schoolboy Q released the behind-the-scenes photos of the song's music video, via his Instagram. However, the music video was never released. Another music video was released showing the duo performing the song at Coachella.

== Remix ==
The song was later remixed, featuring verses from Lamar's Black Hippy cohorts – Ab-Soul, Jay Rock and Schoolboy Q. The remix was included as a bonus track on the Spotify deluxe edition of the album. Chicago rapper Twista also made his own remix.

== Track listing ==
Digital single

No.	Title	Writer(s)	Producer(s)	Length
1.	"The Recipe" (feat. Dr. Dre)	K. Duckworth; A. Young; E. Molina; G. D'Amico; E. Cardona; A. Estella; D. Gupta; B. Ujueta	Scoop DeVille; Dr. Dre	5:53

== Credits and personnel ==
Adapted from the liner notes of Good Kid, M.A.A.D City and Apple Music

Recording and management

- Recorded at Encore Studios (Burbank, California) and TDE Red Room (Carson, California)
- Mixed at No Excuses Studios
- Contains a sample of "Meet the Frownies" as performed by Twin Sister, written by Eric Cardona, Gabe D'Amico, Udbhav Gupta, Andrea Hernandez, and Bryan Ujueta, published by Domino Publishing Company of America (BMI), used courtesy of Dead Oceans.

Personnel

- Kendrick Lamar – vocals
- Dr. Dre – vocals, mixing
- Scoop DeVille – production
- Andre Brissett – additional keyboards
- Andrew Clifton – additional keyboards
- Eric Hudson – additional keyboards
- Trevor Lawrence – additional drums
- Gabby Jayne – additional vocals
- Sly "Pyper" Jordan – additional vocals
- Mauricio "Veto" Iragorri – recording engineering, assistant mixing
- Derek "MixedByAli" Ali – recording engineering
- Drew Adams – assistant recording engineering
- Quentin Gilkey – assistant recording engineering
- Robert Reyes – assistant recording engineering
- Mike Bozzi – mastering
- Brian Gardner – mastering

== Charts ==
Chart (2012)	Peak position
US Bubbling Under Hot 100 (Billboard)	3
US Hot R&B/Hip-Hop Songs (Billboard)	38
US Hot Rap Songs (Billboard)	23
US Rhythmic Airplay (Billboard)	29

== Certifications ==
Region	Certification	Certified units/sales
Australia (ARIA)	Platinum	70,000^{‡}
Canada (Music Canada)	2× Platinum	160,000^{‡}
New Zealand (RMNZ)	Platinum	30,000^{‡}
United Kingdom (BPI)	Silver	200,000^{‡}
United States (RIAA)	Platinum	1,000,000^{‡}
^{‡} Sales+streaming figures based on certification alone.

== Release history ==
Country	Date	Format	Label
United States	April 3, 2012	Digital download	Aftermath; Interscope
United States	May 8, 2012	Radio airplay	Aftermath; Interscope
