= AZ Chike =

American rapper

- AZ Chike in 2025

Background information
- Also known as: AzChike
- Born: Damaria Kayshawn Walker; July 28, 1995 (age 31)
- Origin: Los Angeles, California, U.S.
- Genre: West Coast hip-hop
- Occupations: Rapper; singer; songwriter
- Instrument: Vocals
- Years active: 2013–present
- Labels: Warner; Atlantic; Machine Works; Asylum
- Member of: AZ Cult
- Website: azchikeofficial.com

Damaria Kayshawn Walker, better known by his stage name AZ Chike, is an American rapper from Los Angeles, California. After a brief tenure with Atlantic Records, he self-released five albums before signing with Warner Records to release his seventh album, No Rest for the Wicked (2026).

== Early life ==
AZ Chike grew up in South Central Los Angeles. After high school, he worked several jobs, including one at Sprouts Farmers Market, but quit in 2015 to pursue making music.

== Career ==
AZ Chike has rapped since 2013. Around the same time, he and his friends formed the AZ Cult, a four-member hip-hop collective. In 2017, his song "Burn Rubber Again" went viral and garnered millions of listens on SoundCloud. Shortly after, he received a co-sign from Shoreline Mafia, released his debut mixtape, My World, and performed at Rolling Loud. He also toured along with Shoreline Mafia.

In 2019, AZ Chike signed with Atlantic Records, specifically its Machine Works label, and Asylum Records. He also released his debut album, Rich & Ratchet, and went on tour with rapper 1TakeJay. The same year, he released a three-song EP, AlmightyChike, with rapper Almighty Suspect. One year later, in 2020, AZ Chike released Yors Truly EP. From then on, his singles would court attention from publications like Pitchfork, The Fader, and Revolt. In 2022, he released the album Chike Different.

In 2024, AZ Chike was featured on Schoolboy Q's album Blue Lips on the song "Movie". At Schoolboy Q and Devin Malik's show at The Roxy Theatre, he performed a 30-minute set. AZ Chike performed at Kendrick Lamar's The Pop Out: Ken & Friends in June at the Kia Forum. The same year, he appeared on Kendrick Lamar's album GNX on the song "Peekaboo".

On 21 February 2025, AZ Chike released "Whatx2" as a single along with its music video, simultaneously announcing his signing to Warner Records.

Kendrick Lamar brought him as a surprise guest to live perform "Peekaboo" during the last Inglewood concert at SoFi Stadium of the Grand National Tour, on 24 May 2025.

On 10 September 2025, he was featured on Kai Cenat's Mafiathon 3 Freestyle, where he rapped over an untitled instrumental later to be revealed the one for "Hit A Nerve".

On October 2025, JD Sports and New Balance teamed up with him, along with singer Amber Mark, for an exclusive limited edition sneakers release and campaign.

On 14 November 2025, AZ Chike released the single "Hit A Nerve", along with a music video on YouTube, in which he promoted his upcoming album titled N.R.F.T.W., which was labeled multiple times through the video. Eight days later he performed live during the 11th edition of Camp Flog Gnaw Carnival, on November 22.

In June 2026, AZ Chike released the single "Packed Up", produced by Hit-Boy, along with a music video.

In August 2026, he announced the single "Look Like My Mama" featuring Tyler, the Creator, and revealed the album cover for his album No Rest for the Wicked, abbreviated N.R.F.T.W., released on September 18th of the same year. "Look Like My Mama" was released on August 28th, along with a music video directed by Stacking Memories, reenacting scenes from different films, including Napoleon Dynamite (2004), Dead Presidents (1995), Paid in Full (2002), Sinners (2025), and Men in Black (1997). AZ Chike will headline his first solo tour in support of the album, the Monster Energy-sponsored No Rest for the Wicked Tour will last from October 5 until November 9.

== Personal life ==
AZ Chike was born in July 28, 1995, and has two younger brothers.

== Discography ==
=== Studio albums ===
Title	Album details
Rich & Ratchet	Released: September 24, 2019; Label: Machine Works, Atlantic; Format: Digital download, streaming
Chike Different	Released: March 23, 2022; Label: AZCult; Format: Digital download, streaming
I.S.W.I.L.L	Released: September 21, 2022; Label: AZCult; Format: Digital download, streaming
Born to Be Important	Released: August 25, 2023; Label: AZCult; Format: Digital download, streaming
Chizzle	Released: March 8, 2024; Label: AZCult; Format: Digital download, streaming
Spooky Summer	Released: July 22, 2024; Label: Self-released; Format: Digital download, streaming
No Rest for the Wicked	Released: September 18, 2026; Label: Warner; Format: LP, digital download, streaming

=== Collaborative albums ===
Title	Album details
Kourtesy of Us (with Rucci)	Released: October 8, 2021; Label: Mackk&Cult, Empire; Format: Digital download, streaming
Don't Die Yet (with LowTheGreat)	Released: October 11, 2024; Label: Low the Great, Duetti; Format: Digital download, streaming

=== Commercial mixtapes ===
Title	Album details
My World	Released: March 21, 2018; Label: AZCult; Format: Digital download, streaming

=== Extended plays ===
Title	Album details
Cult Up	Released: July 27, 2017; Label: AZCult; Format: Digital download, streaming
Chike the Great	Released: September 9, 2017; Label: AZCult; Format: Digital download, streaming
AlmightyChike (with Almighty Suspect)	Released: February 1, 2019; Label: Almighty Millionaires; Format: Digital download, streaming
FuckWaiting	Released: August 31, 2019; Label: AZCult; Format: Digital download, streaming
Yors Truly	Released: April 29, 2020; Label: AZCult; Format: Digital download, streaming
Gee Oh Dee	Released: August 20, 2020; Label: AZCult; Format: Digital download, streaming
Almighty Chike 2 (with Almighty Suspect)	Released: November 18, 2020; Label: Almighty Millionaires, AZCult; Format: Digital download, streaming

=== Singles ===
List of singles as lead artist, showing year released
Title	Year	Peak chart positions	Album
Title	Year	US R&B/HH	Album
"Burn Rubber Again"	2017	—	Chike the Great
"Burn Rubber Again (Remix)" (featuring Almighty Suspect)	2017	—	Non-album singles
"The One"	2018	—	Non-album singles
"Tweakin'" (with AzSwaye)	2018	—	Non-album singles
"How"	2018	—	Non-album singles
"Strapped Up" (featuring Mike Sherm and G-Bo Lean)	2019	—	Non-album singles
"Shoes on My Feet"	2020	—	Non-album singles
"One More"	2020	—	Non-album singles
"Heated" (featuring Bravo the Bagchaser)	2021	—	Non-album singles
"Brand New"	2022	—	Non-album singles
"The Road"	2024	—	Non-album singles
"Numbers" (with Mike Sherm)	2024	—	Non-album singles
"Fuck It Up" (with Bravo the Bagchaser)	2024	—	Non-album singles
"Right 2" (with Rucci)	2024	—	Non-album singles
"Back" (with AzSwaye and AzKilo)	2024	—	Non-album singles
"Love Yo Weapons"	2024	—	Non-album singles
"Whatx2"	2025	—	Non-album singles
"Thuggin Not Clubbin" (with Peysoh)	2025	—	Non-album singles
"Game Time"	2025	—	Non-album singles
"Start Dissin'" (with Hit-Boy, Spank Nitti James, and BabyTron)	2025	—	Non-album singles
"Hit a Nerve"	2025	—	Non-album singles
"Get Brackin & Come Back" (with Rucci and RJMrLA)	2026	—	Non-album singles
"Packed Up"	2026	—	No Rest for the Wicked
"Look Like My Mama" (featuring Tyler, the Creator)	2026	41	No Rest for the Wicked
"All That Matters" (with 6lack and Leon Thomas)	2026	—	Love Is the New Gangsta

== Concert tours ==
- No Rest for the Wicked Tour (2026)
