= Bitch, Don't Kill My Vibe =

Single by Kendrick Lamar

from the album Good Kid, M.A.A.D City
- Released: March 18, 2013
- Recorded: 2012
- Studio: TDE Red Room (Carson, CA)
- Genre: West Coast hip-hop
- Length: 5:10
- Label: Top Dawg Entertainment; Aftermath; Interscope
- Songwriters: Kendrick Duckworth; Mark Spears; Robin Braun; Vindahl Friis; Lykke Schmidt
- Producer: Sounwave

Kendrick Lamar singles chronology
| "How Many Drinks?" (2013) | "Bitch, Don't Kill My Vibe" (2013) | "We Up" (2013) |

Remix cover
- Cover for remix version featuring Jay-Z

Jay-Z singles chronology
| "Suit & Tie" (2013) | "Bitch, Don't Kill My Vibe" (2013) | "Holy Grail" (2013) |

Emeli Sandé singles chronology
| "Clown" (2013) | "Bitch, Don't Kill My Vibe" (2013) | "Lifted" (2013) |

Music video
- "Bitch, Don't Kill My Vibe" on YouTube

"Bitch, Don't Kill My Vibe"
A 20-second sample of "Bitch, Don't Kill My Vibe" by Kendrick Lamar from Good Kid, M.A.A.D City.

"Bitch, Don't Kill My Vibe" edited for radio as "Trick, Don't Kill My Vibe" or simply "Don't Kill My Vibe", is a song by American rapper Kendrick Lamar from his second studio album, Good Kid, M.A.A.D City (2012). The song, produced by frequent collaborator Sounwave of Top Dawg Entertainment in-house production team Digi+Phonics, heavily samples "Tiden Flyver" by Danish electronic group Boom Clap Bachelors. It was originally intended to be a collaboration with American singer Lady Gaga, but her contributions were ultimately excluded from the final recording due to timing issues. A remix of "Bitch, Don't Kill My Vibe" featuring American rapper Jay-Z was sent to radio as the album's fifth single on March 21, 2013, with the original version and another remix featuring British singer Emeli Sandé later being released.

The song's music video, directed by The Lil Homie and OG Mike Mihail, ends with an abrupt cut to a black title screen reading "Death to Molly", intended to be a criticism by Lamar of glorification of the drug MDMA in hip hop music. In the United States, "Bitch, Don't Kill My Vibe" peaked at number 32 on Billboard Hot 100 chart and reached the top ten on the Hot R&B/Hip-Hop Songs and Hot Rap Songs charts.

== Background ==
Recorded for Lamar's second studio album Good Kid, M.A.A.D City (2012), "Bitch, Don't Kill My Vibe" originally featured vocals from American pop musician Lady Gaga. On August 15, 2012, Gaga announced that she had collaborated with Lamar on another song recorded for Good Kid, M.A.A.D City entitled "Partynauseous", and that it would be released on September 6. Eight days later, she announced that the song would no longer be released on the announced date and apologized to fans for the delay. None of Gaga's contributions were ultimately featured on the album due to timing issues and creative differences, with Lamar stating:

We had a date, but we had to meet the deadline for the pre-order date. That's just the business side coming through and messing things up. But you know it's God's plan. I'm not really too tight about it because I know we have something special.

On November 8, 2012, Lady Gaga released the original version of the song featuring her vocals, in which she performs the chorus and a verse. Lamar expressed his surprise and approval of her releasing the song, as he felt it showed confidence in their work together.

== Live performances ==
Lamar included "Bitch, Don't Kill My Vibe" in the set list of the Damn Tour (2017). He also performed "Bitch, Don't Kill My Vibe" alongside other songs on the Grand National Tour (2025).

== Music video ==
The music video for "Bitch, Don't Kill My Vibe", directed by The Lil Homie and OG Mike Mihail, was released on May 13, 2013. The same day, the director's cut of the video was released, featuring cameo appearances from Juicy J and Jay Rock and a bonus clip of a song by Schoolboy Q, titled "Man of the Year". American comedian Mike Epps makes appearances throughout the video.

The video ends with a hard cutoff of the string ensemble to a black screen with white text reading "Death to Molly". In an MTV News interview, Lamar explained that the text was meant as a criticism of lyrical promotion of the drug MDMA—popularly known as "Molly"—in hip hop music, saying: "When everybody consciously now uses this term or this phrase and putting it in lyrics, it waters the culture down... So it's really just time to move on."

== Remixes ==
On March 13, 2013, a snippet of the official remix for "Bitch Don't Kill My Vibe" featuring a guest appearance from American rapper Jay-Z was premiered by Jay-Z's engineer Young Guru. When Lamar touched on the record, he called it an accomplishment to have a song featuring Jay-Z and revealed that he wrote his verse for the remix in one day. The full version of the remix was premiered by Funkmaster Flex on March 17, 2013. The remix was added to the track listing of the iTunes Store version of the album and subsequently released to rhythmic contemporary radio on April 9, 2013. Its single cover is a photograph of basketball players Kobe Bryant and Michael Jordan, who serve as representations of, respectively, Lamar and Jay-Z.

A remix of "Bitch Don't Kill My Vibe" featuring British singer-songwriter Emeli Sandé, billed as the "International Remix", was released on May 27, 2013. The two had previously debuted the song live at the Footaction event in New York City earlier in the month. The remix was released as a digital single on June 25, 2013. On the remix, Sandé performs a new intro section and duets with Lamar on the refrain.

== Release and reception ==
Speaking to Rap-Up on March 9, 2013, Lamar stated that "Bitch, Don't Kill My Vibe" would probably be released as a single from Good Kid, M.A.A.D City. Shortly after the premiere of the song's official remix, Lamar confirmed that "Bitch, Don't Kill My Vibe" would be the fourth official single.

Following the release of Good Kid, M.A.A.D City, "Bitch, Don't Kill My Vibe" debuted at number 100 on the Billboard Hot 100 for the week ending January 13, 2013. It re-entered the Hot 100 at number 84 for the week ending March 24, later peaking at number 32 and becoming his third top 40 hit as a solo artist on the chart.

"Bitch, Don't Kill My Vibe" has been widely regarded as one of Lamar's best songs. In 2018, Billboard ranked the song number nine on their list of the 20 greatest Kendrick Lamar songs, and in 2021, Rolling Stone ranked the song number five on their list of the 50 greatest Kendrick Lamar songs.

== Awards and nominations ==
| Year | Organization | Award | Result |
|---|---|---|---|
| 2013 | BET Hip Hop Awards | Best Hip Hop Video | Nominated |
| 2013 | BET Hip Hop Awards | Track of the Year | Nominated |
| 2013 | BET Hip Hop Awards | People's Champ Award | Nominated |

== Formats and track listings ==
- Digital download
1. "Bitch, Don't Kill My Vibe" (edited version) – 5:11
2. "Bitch, Don't Kill My Vibe" (explicit version) – 5:11
3. "Bitch, Don't Kill My Vibe" (remix / explicit version) (featuring Jay-Z) – 4:39
4. "Bitch, Don't Kill My Vibe" (International remix / explicit version) (featuring Emeli Sandé) – 5:06
- Digital download (remix)
1. "Bitch, Don't Kill My Vibe" (remix) (featuring Emeli Sandé) – 5:06

== Charts ==
=== Weekly charts ===
Weekly chart performance
| Chart (2012–2013) | Peak position |
|---|---|
| Belgium Urban (Ultratop Flanders) | 49 |
| Netherlands (Tipparade) Emeli Sandé remix | 16 |
| UK Hip Hop/R&B (Official Charts) | 28 |
| US Billboard Hot 100 | 32 |
| US Hot R&B/Hip-Hop Songs (Billboard) | 9 |
| US Rhythmic Airplay (Billboard) | 8 |

=== Year-end charts ===
Annual chart rankings
| Chart (2013) | Position |
|---|---|
| US Hot R&B/Hip-Hop Songs (Billboard) | 20 |
| US Rhythmic (Billboard) | 40 |
| US Streaming Songs (Billboard) | 74 |

== Certifications ==
| Region | Certification | Certified units/sales |
|---|---|---|
| Australia (ARIA) Emeli Sandé remix | 4× Platinum | 280,000^{‡} |
| Brazil (Pro-Música Brasil) | Platinum | 60,000^{‡} |
| Canada (Music Canada) | 3× Platinum | 240,000^{‡} |
| Denmark (IFPI Danmark) | Platinum | 90,000^{‡} |
| Germany (BVMI) | Gold | 150,000^{‡} |
| New Zealand (RMNZ) | 4× Platinum | 120,000^{‡} |
| United Kingdom (BPI) | Platinum | 600,000^{‡} |
| United States (RIAA) | 4× Platinum | 4,000,000^{‡} |
^{‡} Sales+streaming figures based on certification alone.

== Radio and release history ==
| Country | Date | Format | Label | Ref. |
|---|---|---|---|---|
| Australia | March 21, 2013 | Mainstream radio (Jay-Z remix) | Universal | |
| United States | April 9, 2013 | Rhythmic radio (Jay-Z remix) | Top Dawg; Aftermath; Interscope | |
| United States | June 25, 2013 | Digital download (Emeli Sandé remix) | Top Dawg; Aftermath; Interscope | |
| Ireland | July 7, 2013 | Digital download | Universal | |
| United Kingdom | July 7, 2013 | Digital download | Universal | |
