= Derek Ali =

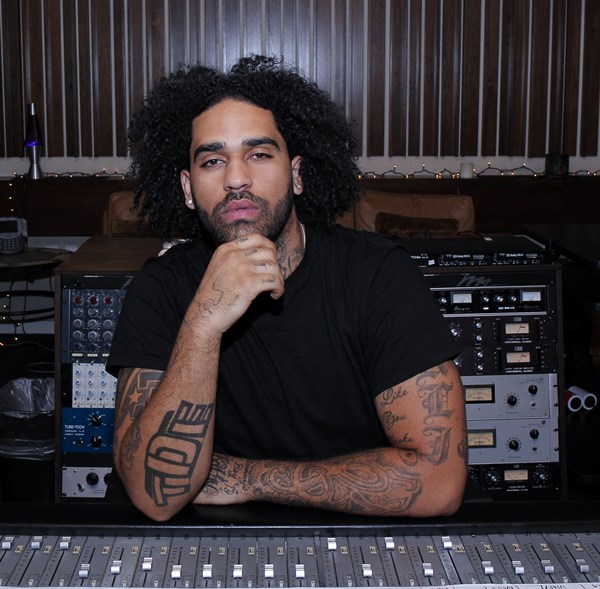

Background information
- Also known as: Derek "MixedByAli" Ali; MixedByAli; Mixed by Ali
- Born: Derek Ali; November 1, 1989 (age 36)
- Origin: Los Angeles, California, U.S.
- Genres: Hip-hop; R&B
- Occupations: Mixing engineer; Recording engineer
- Years active: 2010s–present
- Label: Top Dawg Entertainment
- Website: www.engineears.com

Derek Ali (born November 1, 1989), known professionally as MixedByAli, is an American mixing engineer. His career started in Los Angeles in the late-2000s, where he began recording and mixing for artists under Top Dawg Entertainment. He initially started collaborating with other artists from the Top Dawg Entertainment roster, including Schoolboy Q, Kendrick Lamar, Jay Rock, and SZA. Over time, he broadened his portfolio by working with other prominent artists such as Bas, Nipsey Hussle, Snoop Dogg, and many more.

In 2018, he invented an online mixing program and community for mixing engineers called EngineEars which is aimed at teaching upcoming engineers techniques that will improve the quality of mixes they create and provide a world class mixing access to artists remotely.

== Technique ==
Ali mixes "in the box" (without the use of analog gear) when working with certain audio effects, such as vocals. However, he credits a mixing console for his "crispiness". About using hardware, Ali says: "If you have the gear, I suggest you use it. How I look at this way of mixing is I feel like you're inside the computer."

About 80% of his time spent mixing is in mono, which is a method he learned from Dr. Dre.

== Awards ==
Ali has been nominated for the Grammy Awards 6 times and has won three times.

=== Nominations ===
- 2012: Album of the Year – Good Kid, M.A.A.D City by Kendrick Lamar
- 2015: Album of the Year – To Pimp a Butterfly by Kendrick Lamar
- 2017: Album of the Year – Damn by Kendrick Lamar
- 2017: Record of the Year – :Humble" by Kendrick Lamar

=== Wins ===
- 2015: Best Rap Album – To Pimp a Butterfly by Kendrick Lamar
- 2017: Best Rap Album – Damn by Kendrick Lamar
- 2018: Record of the Year – This Is America by Childish Gambino

== Discography ==
- 2026: AZ Chike - No Rest for the Wicked
- 2021: Brockhampton – Roadrunner: New Light, New Machine
- 2020: Spillage Village – Spilligion
- 2020: Glass Animals – "Space Ghost Coast to Coast"
- 2018: Bas – Milky Way
- 2018: Jay Rock – Redemption
- 2018: Childish Gambino – "This Is America"
- 2018: Cardi B – "She Bad"
- 2018: Nipsey Hussle – Victory Lap
- 2018: Kendrick Lamar – "Redemption" and "Big Shot"
- 2018: Arin Ray – Platinum Fire
- 2017: SZA – Ctrl
- 2017: Kendrick Lamar – Damn
- 2015: Kendrick Lamar – To Pimp a Butterfly
- 2012: Kendrick Lamar – Good Kid, M.A.A.D City
- 2012: ScHoolboy Q – Habits & Contradictions
- 2012: Ab-Soul – Control System
- 2011: ScHoolboy Q – Setbacks
- 2011: Ab-Soul – Longterm Mentality
- 2011: Kendrick Lamar – Section.80
- 2011: Jay Rock – Follow Me Home
- 2010: Kendrick Lamar – Overly Dedicated

== Mentors ==
Though Ali was introduced to mixing DAWs like Pro Tools by Punch and Dave Free, his most notable professional teacher is Dr. Dre whom he served under as an intern.
