= Follow Me Home (album) =

Studio album by Jay Rock
- Released: July 26, 2011
- Recorded: 2008–2011
- Genre: West Coast hip hop; gangsta rap
- Length: 68:57
- Label: TDE; Strange; Fontana
- Producer: Anthony "TOPDAWG" Tiffith; Travis O'Guin; Cool & Dre; Dae One; Focus...; J. LBS; J.U.S.T.I.C.E. League; Keith the Beast; Phonix Beats; Rob E; Sounwave; Terrace Martin; Tha Bizness; Willie B

Jay Rock chronology
Black Friday (2010)	Follow Me Home (2011)	90059 (2015)

Singles from Follow Me Home
- 1. "All My Life (In the Ghetto)" Released: October 16, 2008; 2. "Hood Gone Love It" Released: June 21, 2011

Follow Me Home is the debut studio album by American hip hop recording artist Jay Rock; it was released on July 26, 2011, under Top Dawg Entertainment (TDE) and Strange Music. The album was preceded by two singles; "All My Life (In the Ghetto)" and "Hood Gone Love It".

The album features guest appearances from labelmates Kendrick Lamar, Schoolboy Q, and Ab-Soul along with Lil Wayne, will.i.am, Chris Brown, Tech N9ne and Rick Ross, among others. The album's production was handled by Cool & Dre, Focus..., J.U.S.T.I.C.E. League, Sounwave, Terrace Martin, Tha Bizness and Willie B, among others. The album debuted at number 83 on the US Billboard 200, selling 5,300 copies in its first week.

== Background ==
In an interview promoting the album, Jay Rock stated: "If you have been through a struggle, you are going to feel this album". He has described the album as being his story, coming from nothing and gunning for the top. He compared this album to N.W.A's albums, as he's made the album for the ghetto, saying it's not for the radio, nor is it for the club. Although signed to independent record labels Top Dawg and Strange, Jay Rock still worked with several mainstream artists and high-profile record producers on the album.

=== Guests and production ===
Jay Rock worked with a number of artists on the album, including Lil Wayne, will.i.am, Chris Brown, Tech N9ne and Rick Ross, as well as his Black Hippy cohorts Kendrick Lamar, Schoolboy Q and Ab-Soul.

The album includes production from Cool & Dre, Dae One, Focus..., J. LBS, J.U.S.T.I.C.E. League, Keith the Beast, Phonix Beats, Rob E, Sounwave, Terrace Martin, Tha Bizness, and Willie B.

== Release and promotion ==
Jay Rock was an opening act with Nipsey Hussle on The L.A.X. Tour in promotion of The Game's third studio album L.A.X. in 2009. In 2010 Jay Rock went on tour with G-Unit and American rapper 50 Cent on The Invitation Tour in promotion of the album. After that tour wrapped up he went on tour with Tech N9ne, E-40, Glasses Malone and Kutt Calhoun on the Independent Grind Tour.

=== Singles ===
Two singles were released for the album: "All My Life (In the Ghetto)" and "Hood Gone Love It. "All My Life" features Lil Wayne and will.i.am and "Hood Gone Love It" features Kendrick Lamar. The official remix of "All My Life" features Busta Rhymes, The Game and Gorilla Zoe while the official remix of "Hood Gone Love It" features Rick Ross and Birdman. "Hood Gone Love It" was featured in the Franklin Trailer for Grand Theft Auto V.

=== Music videos ===
On June 24 a music video was released via MTV for the single "Hood Gone Love It". Videos for album tracks "All My Life, "Life's a Gamble", "Say Wassup" (feat. Ab-Soul, Kendrick Lamar & Schoolboy Q) and "Just Like Me" were filmed and all released before the album to create a buzz. Also the songs, "Code Red" (feat. Kendrick Lamar) ("Boomerang") "No Joke" (feat. Ab-Soul) "M.O.N.E.Y." (feat. J. Black) & ("Elbows") Jay Rock released these tracks and made a music video out of them.

== Critical reception ==
Professional ratings
Aggregate scores
Source	Rating
Metacritic	73/100
Review scores
Source	Rating
AllMusic	3/5 stars
Entertainment Weekly	B+
HipHopDX	3.5/5 stars
HipHopSite.Com	4/5 stars
XXL	4/5 stars

Upon its release, Follow Me Home was met with positive reviews, with critics praising Jay Rock's lyrical ability, his narrative skills, his production selection, and the Old-School West Coast feel. The album also holds a score of 73 out of a 100 on Metacritic based on 5 reviews which indicates generally favorable reviews. Kyle Anderson of Entertainment Weekly praises the old school West Coast feel of the album, Jay Rock's flow and the minimalistic beats. Also comparing it to Game's debut album. XXL gave the album a XL praising Rock's; lyrical storytelling, crossover ability of "Just Like Me" and "Westside" along with the production of "Elbows" and "Code Red". AllMusic gave the album a 3 out of 5, calling the album a "real life urban drama script" while praising the album's production and collaborators. HipHopDX complimented the introspective lyrics of "Just Like Me" and "M.O.N.E.Y." while also praising the West Coast production of "Elbows and "Code Red" and Lil Wayne and Rick Ross's collaborations on "All My Life" and "Finest Hour" respectively. Their final score for the album was 3.5 out of 5.

== Track listing ==
The track listing for Follow Me Home was confirmed by the website HipHopDX.

No.	Title	Writer(s)	Producer(s)	Length
1.	"Intro (Skit)"	Johnny McKinzie; Mark Spears	Sounwave	1:03
2.	"Code Red"	McKinzie; Darius Barnes	Phonix Beats	2:45
3.	"Bout That"	McKinzie; Bernard Edwards, Jr.	Focus...	3:56
4.	"No Joke" (featuring Ab-Soul)	McKinzie; Herbert Stevens; Willie Brown	Willie B	4:20
5.	"Hood Gone Love It" (featuring Kendrick Lamar)	McKinzie; Kendrick Duckworth; Erik Ortiz; Kevin Crowe	J.U.S.T.I.C.E. League	4:05
6.	"Westside" (featuring Chris Brown)	McKinzie; Christopher Brown; Justin Henderson	Tha Bizness	3:38
7.	"Elbows"	McKinzie; Barnes	Phonix Beats	4:14
8.	"Boomerang"	McKinzie; Jason Pounds	J. LBS	3:25
9.	"All I Know Is"	McKinzie; Brown	Willie B	3:41
10.	"I'm Thuggin'"	McKinzie; Brown	Willie B	4:33
11.	"Kill or Be Killed" (featuring Tech N9ne and Krizz Kaliko)	McKinzie; Aaron Yates; Samuel Watson; Brown	Willie B	4:10
12.	"Just Like Me" (featuring J. Black)	McKinzie; Jeret Griffin-Black; Terrace Martin	Terrace Martin	3:42
13.	"Say Wassup" (performed by Black Hippy)	McKinzie; Duckworth; Stevens; Quincy Hanley; Dameon Garrett	Dae One	4:23
14.	"They Be on It"	McKinzie; Duckworth	Keith the Beast	5:06
15.	"M.O.N.E.Y." (featuring J. Black)	McKinzie; Griffin-Black; Martin	Terrace Martin	4:42
16.	"Finest Hour" (featuring Rick Ross and BJ the Chicago Kid)	McKinzie; William Roberts; Bryan Sledge; Ortiz; Crowe	J.U.S.T.I.C.E. League	4:01
17.	"Life's a Gamble"	McKinzie; Robert Rodriguez	Rob E	3:27
18.	"All My Life (In the Ghetto)" (featuring Lil Wayne and will.i.am)	McKinzie; Dwayne Carter, Jr.; William Adams, Jr.; Marcello Valenzano; Andre Lyon	Cool & Dre	3:46
Total length:				68:57

Strange Music pre-order digital bonus track
No.	Title	Length
19.	"Choppa Krazy"	4:55

Notes

- (co.) signifies a co-producer
- "Code Red" features uncredited additional vocals from Kendrick Lamar.
- "Elbows" features uncredited additional vocals from Kendrick Lamar.
- "All I Know Is" features uncredited additional vocals from Alori Joh and Ab-Soul.
- "They Be On It" features uncredited additional vocals from Kendrick Lamar.
- "Life's a Gamble" features uncredited additional vocals from Ab-Soul.

== Charts ==
Chart (2011)	Peak position
US Billboard 200	83
US Independent Albums (Billboard)	14
US Top R&B/Hip-Hop Albums (Billboard)	18
US Top Rap Albums (Billboard)	10
