= Sounds of Crenshaw Vol. 1 =

Sounds Of Crenshaw Vol. 1

Studio album by the Pollyseeds
- Released: July 14, 2017
- Studio: Organic Grease Studios (Los Angeles, CA); Henson Studios (Los Angeles, CA)
- Genre: Jazz; R&B; hip-hop; soul
- Length: 53:39
- Label: Sounds Of Crenshaw; Ropeadope
- Producer: Terrace Martin; Robert Glasper; Marlon Williams (co.)

Terrace Martin chronology
| Velvet Portraits (2016) | Sounds Of Crenshaw Vol. 1 (2017) | Dinner Party (2020) |

Sounds of Crenshaw Vol. 1 is the first studio album by American musical supergroup the Pollyseeds. It was released on July 14, 2017, through Sounds Of Crenshaw and Ropeadope Records. Recording sessions took place at Organic Grease Studios and Henson Recording Studios in Los Angeles. Production was handled by Terrace Martin and Robert Glasper, with co-producer Marlon Williams.

In the United States, the album debuted at number 3 on the Jazz Albums and topped the Contemporary Jazz Albums charts. In the United Kingdom, it reached number 23 on the Official Hip Hop and R&B Albums Chart and number 48 on the Official Independent Albums Chart.

== Critical reception ==
Professional ratings
Aggregate scores
| Source | Rating |
|---|---|
| Metacritic | 81/100 |
Review scores
| Source | Rating |
| AllMusic | 4/5 stars |
| Clash | 8/10 |
| Exclaim! | 9/10 |
| HipHopDX | 4/5 |
| Pitchfork | 7.6/10 |
| Record Collector | 4/5 stars |
| The Guardian | 3/5 stars |
| The Times | 5/5 stars |

Sounds of Crenshaw Vol. 1 was met with universal acclaim from music critics. At Metacritic, which assigns a normalized rating out of 100 to reviews from mainstream publications, the album received an average score of 81 based on nine reviews.

Kevin Press of Exclaim! praised the album, saying that it is a "deeply funky jazz record with a sensibility that incorporates the best of this L.A. neighbourhood's long fascination with hip-hop and R&B. It captures the full breadth of the region's rich musical history. ... This is, at the very least, the record of the summer. For some, it might just be the record of 2017". AllMusic's Andy Kellman stated: "the freewheeling, uplifted spirit likewise continues. Martin and company combine and alternate between groove-oriented contemporary jazz, soul, funk, and hip-hop". Ammar Kalia of Clash resumed: "although the second half of the record loses steam somewhat with a succession of slow R&B vocal numbers like "Your Space" and "Feelings of the World", Sounds of Crenshaw Vol. 1 largely maintains its coherence. Its slight messiness is representative of a life lived, something that in itself never coheres as a perfect narrative". Ural Garrett of HipHopDX found it "feels like the ideal soundtrack to the iconic 23-mile street named after the real estate banker George Lafayette Crenshaw. It won't transcend to other hoods but Martin and crew win by developing a project that's sonically ambitious from beginning to end". Charles Waring of Record Collector wrote: "while the relaxed vibe is continuous, the music isn't repetitive but there's nothing really new here: rather it's an extension of what Sade's band Sweetback and trumpeter Roy Hargrove's RH Factor were doing well over a decade ago. Even so, it's an enthralling fusion of sounds and styles". Seth Colter Walls of Pitchfork concluded: "over time, the album's subtle ambition becomes impossible to miss".

In his mixed review for The Guardian, John Lewis wrote: "[Terrace Martin's] latest project uses some heavyweight jazz talents but takes us into more mainstream R&B territory, with decent neosoul numbers including "Intentions" (featuring Chachi) and "You and Me" (featuring Rose Gold) mixed with rather bland and soporific fuzak".

== Track listing ==
| No. | Title | Writer(s) | Producer(s) | Length |
|---|---|---|---|---|
| 1. | "Tapestry" | Rose McKinney; Terrace Martin; Marlon Williams | Terrace Martin | 0:28 |
| 2. | "Chef E Dubble" | McKinney; T. Martin; Robert Glasper | Terrace Martin; Robert Glasper; Marlon Williams (co.) | 4:30 |
| 3. | "Intentions" (featuring Chachi) | McKinney; T. Martin; Williams; Craig Brockman; Jason Martin | Terrace Martin; Marlon Williams (co.) | 4:00 |
| 4. | "Funny How Time Flies" | Janet Jackson; James Harris III; Terry Lewis | Terrace Martin; Robert Glasper | 7:05 |
| 5. | "Mama D/Leimert Park" | McKinney; T. Martin; Larrance Dopson | Terrace Martin; Marlon Williams (co.) | 5:18 |
| 6. | "You and Me" (featuring Rose Gold) | McKinney; T. Martin; Williams; Brockman; Preston Harris | Terrace Martin | 4:49 |
| 7. | "Believe" | Wyann Vaughn; Chris Cadenhead | Terrace Martin; Marlon Williams (co.) | 4:43 |
| 8. | "Up & Away" | McKinney; T. Martin; J. Martin; Vaughn; Trevor Lawrence | Terrace Martin; Marlon Williams (co.) | 4:32 |
| 9. | "Wake Up" | McKinney; T. Martin; Kenneth Crouch | Terrace Martin; Marlon Williams (co.) | 4:16 |
| 10. | "Your Space" (featuring Wyann Vaughn) | McKinney; T. Martin; Williams; Vaughn | Terrace Martin; Marlon Williams (co.) | 4:06 |
| 11. | "Feelings of the World" (featuring Rose Gold and Chachi) | McKinney; T. Martin; Williams; J. Martin; Lawrence; Rebekah Muhammad | Terrace Martin; Marlon Williams (co.) | 4:12 |
| 12. | "Reprise of Us" | McKinney; T. Martin; Brockman | Terrace Martin; Marlon Williams (co.) | 0:30 |
| 13. | "Don't Trip" (featuring Preston Harris) | McKinney; T. Martin; Brockman; Harris | Terrace Martin | 5:10 |
| Total length: | | | | 53:39 |

== Personnel ==
- Terrace Martin – synthesizer (tracks: 1–8, 10–12), alto saxophone (tracks: 2, 3, 7, 12), vocoder (tracks: 3–5, 8, 10–13), drum machine (tracks: 3, 12), percussion (track 7), soprano saxophone (track 9), producer, mixing, executive producer
- Marlon Williams – guitar (tracks: 1–4, 6, 8, 10–13), co-producer (tracks: 2, 3, 5, 7–12), executive A&R
- Robert Glasper – piano & producer (tracks: 2, 4)
- Robert "Sput" Searight – drums (tracks: 2, 4), percussion (track 2)
- Kamasi Washington – tenor saxophone (tracks: 2, 7)
- Jason "Chachi" Martin – vocals (tracks: 3, 11)
- Wyann Vaughn – backing vocals (tracks: 3, 4, 7, 12), vocals (track 10)
- Rose Gold – backing vocals (tracks: 3, 12), vocals (tracks: 6, 11)
- Craig Brockman – piano (tracks: 3, 6, 12, 13)
- Preston Harris – backing vocals (track 6), vocals (track 13)
- Chris Cadenhead – piano (track 7)
- Brandon "Eugene" Owens – bass (track 7)
- Ernest "Curly" Martin – drums (track 7)
- Adam Turchin – baritone saxophone (track 8), creative assistant
- Trevor Lawrence Jr. – drum programming (tracks: 8, 11), drums (track 13)
- Kenneth Crouch – piano (track 9)
- Andrew Gouche – bass (track 13)
- Rick Carson – mixing (track 11), mastering
- Louis Marks – executive producer
- Samantha J – artwork, photography
- Monesia Hobbs – executive A&R
- Jayne Andrew – executive A&R

== Charts ==
| Chart (2017) | Peak position |
|---|---|
| UK R&B Albums (OCC) | 23 |
| UK Independent Albums (OCC) | 48 |
| US Top Jazz Albums (Billboard) | 3 |
| US Top Contemporary Jazz Albums (Billboard) | 1 |
