= Velvet Portraits =

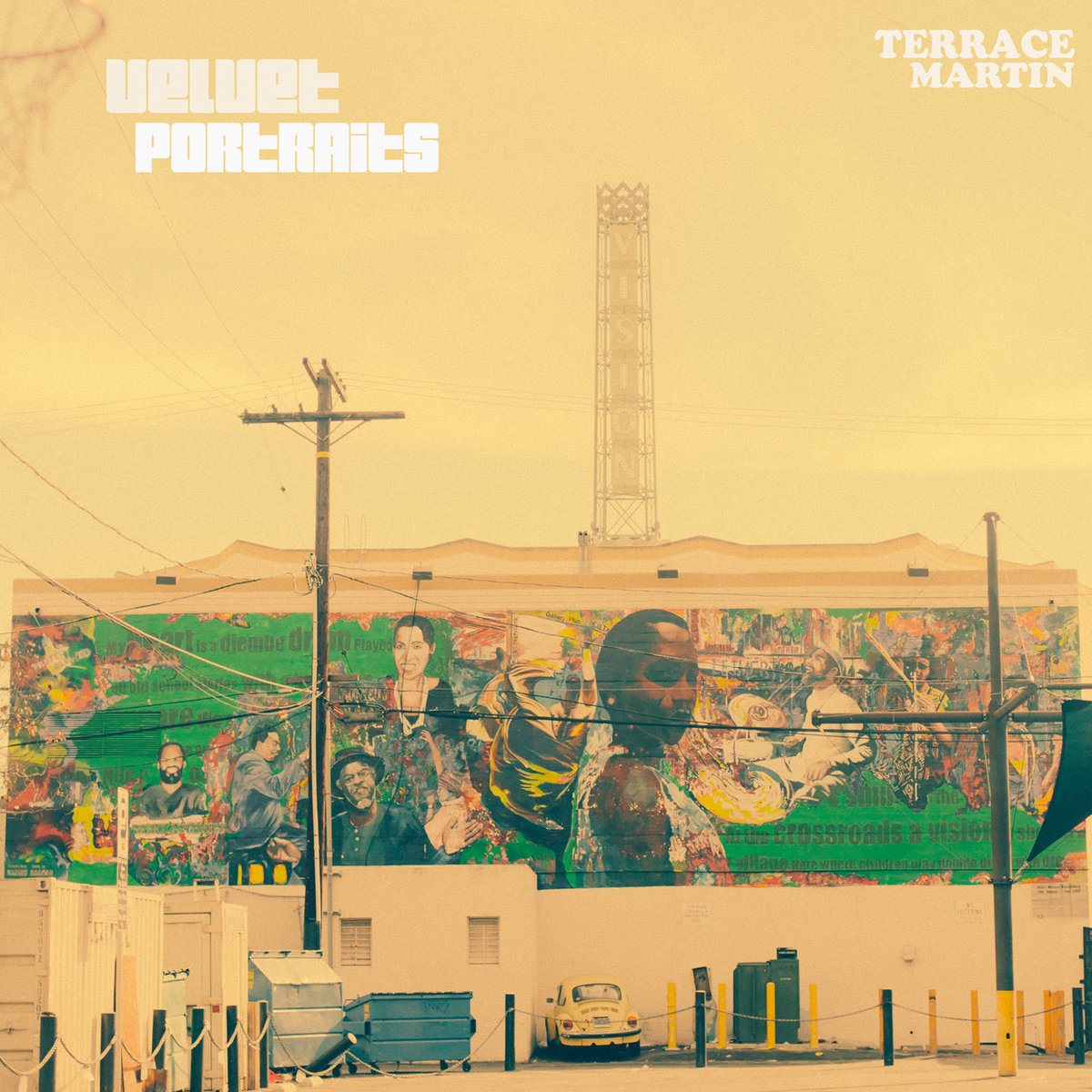

Studio album by Terrace Martin
- Released: April 1, 2016
- Studio: Organic Grease Studios (Los Angeles, CA); Make Believe Studios (Omaha, NE); Ameraycan Studios (North Hollywood, CA; Village Studios (Los Angeles, CA); Red Bull Studios (Los Angeles, CA); Affinia Hotel (New York, NY)
- Genre: R&B; jazz fusion; g-funk
- Length: 1:10:04
- Label: Sounds of Crenshaw; Ropeadope
- Producer: Terrace Martin; DJ Pooh (co.); Robert Searight (co.)

Terrace Martin chronology
3ChordFold (2013)	Velvet Portraits (2016)	Sounds of Crenshaw Vol. 1 (2017)

Professional ratings
Review scores
Source	Rating
AllMusic	3.5/5 stars
HipHopDX	4.1/5
Pitchfork	7.8/10
PopMatters	7/10
Spin	8/10
Tom Hull	B

Velvet Portraits is a studio album by American musician Terrace Martin. It was released on April 1, 2016, through Sounds Of Crenshaw/Ropeadope Records. Recording sessions took place at Organic Grease Studios, Ameraycan Studios, Village Studios and Red Bull Studios in Los Angeles, Make Believe Studios in Omaha and Affinia Hotel in New York. Production was handled by Martin himself, with co-producers Robert Searight and DJ Pooh.

It features guest appearances from Robert Glasper, Candy West, Kamasi Washington, Keyon Harrold, Lalah Hathaway, Marlon Williams, Ronald Bruner Jr., Rose Gold, The Emotions, Thundercat, Tiffany Gouché, Tone Trezure, Uncle Chucc and Wayne Vaughn, as well as contributions from Brandon "Eugene" Owens, Kenneth Crouch, Adam Turchin, Craig Brockman, Allakoi Peete, Chris Cadenhead, Preston Harris, Perri, Mitch Towne, Josef Leimberg, Wanda Vaughn, Wow Jones, and Martin's father and acclaimed jazz drummer Ernest "Curly" Martin.

In the United States, the album peaked at number 2 on the Jazz Albums, number 19 on the Heatseekers Albums and topped the Contemporary Jazz Albums charts. At the 59th Annual Grammy Awards, it was nominated for a Grammy Award for Best R&B Album, but lost to Lalah Hathaway's Lalah Hathaway Live.

The album was developed during the production of Kendrick Lamar's critically acclaimed album To Pimp a Butterfly, to which Martin was a major contributor. The closing track, "Mortal Man", is an elaboration of musical elements from Butterfly's closing track of the same name.

== Track listing ==
No.	Title	Length
1.	"Velvet Portraits"	1:34
2.	"Valdez Off Crenshaw"	4:32
3.	"Push" (featuring Tone Trezure)	4:36
4.	"With You"	4:09
5.	"Curly Martin" (featuring Robert Glasper, Thundercat and Ronald Bruner Jr.)	7:21
6.	"Never Enough" (featuring Tiffany Gouché)	5:33
7.	"Turkey Taco" (featuring Wyann Vaughn and Wayne Vaughn)	4:02
8.	"Patiently Waiting" (featuring Uncle Chucc and The Emotions)	7:01
9.	"Tribe Called West" (featuring Keyon Harrold)	2:34
10.	"Oakland" (featuring Lalah Hathaway)	4:23
11.	"Bromali" (featuring Marlon Williams)	3:38
12.	"Think of You" (featuring Kamasi Washington and Rose Gold)	5:48
13.	"Reverse" (featuring Robert Glasper and Candy West)	3:07
14.	"Mortal Man"	11:46
Total length:		1:10:04

== Personnel ==
- Terrace Martin – main artist, alto saxophone (tracks: 2–10, 12, 14), percussion (tracks: 2, 3, 11, 12), synthesizer (tracks: 2, 9–11, 14), electric piano (tracks: 3, 10, 14), vocoder (tracks: 4, 5, 7), keyboards (tracks: 6, 9), whistle (track 9), producer (tracks: 1–3, 5, 7–12, 14), recording (tracks: 1, 4, 7, 9, 11, 13, 14), arranger (track 10), executive producer
- Preston Harris – vocals (track 1)
- Craig Brockman – piano (track 1), electric piano (track 8), organ (tracks: 8, 14)
- Kenneth Crouch – keyboards (track 1), organ (track 11), additional keyboards (track 13), grand piano (track 14)
- Robert "Sput" Searight – electric piano (tracks: 2, 3, 10, 11, 14), synthesizer & co-producer (track 2), clavinet & additional percussion (track 3), keyboards (track 6)
- Marlon Williams – featured artist (track 11), guitar (tracks: 2–12, 14)
- Brandon "Eugene" Owens – bass (tracks: 2, 3, 6, 8, 11, 12), electric bass (track 11)
- Latonya "Tone Trezure" Givens – featured artist (track 3)
- Perri – backing vocals (track 3)
- Mitch Towne – organ (track 3)
- Ernest "Curly" Martin – drums (tracks: 3, 6, 8, 11, 12, 14), percussion (track 10)
- Adam Turchin – tenor saxophone (track 3), baritone saxophone (tracks: 5, 8)
- Josef Leimberg – trumpet (track 3)
- Robert Glasper – featured artist (tracks: 5, 13), electric piano (track 5), piano (track 13)
- Stephen "Thundercat" Bruner – featured artist & bass (track 5)
- Ronald Bruner Jr. – featured artist & drums (track 5)
- Allakoi Peete – percussion (tracks: 5, 14)
- Tiffany Gouché – featured artist (track 6)
- Wayne Vaughn – featured artist (track 7)
- Wyann Vaughn – featured artist (track 7)
- Wanda Vaughn – backing vocals (track 7)
- Charles "Uncle Chucc" Hamilton – featured artist (track 8)
- The Emotions – featured artist (track 8)
- Chris Cadenhead – electric piano (tracks: 8, 12)
- Keyon Harrold – featured artist & trumpet (track 9)
- Kamasi Washington – featured artist (track 12), tenor saxophone (tracks: 9, 12), strings arranger (track 14)
- Eulaulah Donyll "Lalah" Hathaway – featured artist (track 10)
- Rebekah "Rose Gold" Muhammad – featured artist (track 12)
- Candy West – featured artist (track 13)
- Wow Jones – synthesizer (track 14)
- Mark "DJ Pooh" Jordan – co-producer (track 7)
- Jeremy Deaton – recording (tracks: 2, 3, 6, 11, 14)
- Rick Carson – recording (tracks: 2, 3, 6, 11, 14)
- Joey Galvan – recording (track 3)
- Louis Marks – executive producer
- Samantha J – art direction, photography
- Sean Nana – photography

== Charts ==
Chart (2016)	Peak position
US Top Jazz Albums (Billboard)	2
US Top Contemporary Jazz Albums (Billboard)	1
US Heatseekers Albums (Billboard)	19
