= Punch (rapper) =

American rapper

- Also known as: Punchino
- Born: Terrence Louis Henderson Jr.
- Origin: Carson, California, U.S.
- Genres: West Coast hip hop
- Occupations: Rapper; songwriter; record producer; record executive; talent manager
- Instrument: Vocals
- Years active: 2004–present
- Label: Top Dawg
- Member of: A Room Full of Mirrors

Terrence Louis Henderson Jr., better known by his stage name Punch, is an American rapper, songwriter, record producer, record executive and talent manager known for being the president of independent record label Top Dawg Entertainment (TDE) and managing singer-songwriter SZA. He has also executive produced several successful albums, including Kendrick Lamar's Section.80 (2011), Schoolboy Q's Habits & Contradictions (2012), Terrace Martin's 3ChordFold (2013), and more. Aside from his solo musical career, Punch is a member of hip hop collective A Room Full of Mirrors, alongside fellow rappers Daylyt, Nick Grant, The Ichiban Don, Lyric Michelle, Hari, and more.

== Career ==
Terrence Henderson founded the Carson, California-based independent record label Top Dawg Entertainment (TDE) in 2004, with Anthony "Top Dawg" Tiffith and David "Dave Free" Friley. He then began his musical career in 2007 under the moniker Punch. In March 2016, Punch revealed plans to release his debut studio album. Punch told Billboard that he plans on doing "a project for sure", even though his artistic process has usually come in spurts: "I think I’m going to finally finish it because I write a lot and I record every so often. I think I’m just gonna go ahead and knock it out at this point." On December 5, 2016, Punch released a single titled "Gold". In 2021, he formed Aroomfullofmirrors, a hip-hop supergroup featuring himself, Nick Grant, Daylyt, Earlee Riser, Billymarie, Lyric Michelle, Ichiban Don, Hari, and Jrias Law.

== Discography ==
=== Studio albums ===
List of studio albums, with year released
Title	Album details
TBA	Scheduled: TBA; Label: Top Dawg Entertainment; Formats: CD, Digital download

=== Mixtapes ===
List of mixtapes, with year released
Title	Album details
Do It Nigga Squad, Volume 1 (with Top Dawg Entertainment)	Released: May 10, 2008; Label: Top Dawg; Formats: Digital download
All Rize to tha Top (with Top Dawg Entertainment)	Released: April 9, 2009; Label: Top Dawg; Formats: Digital download

=== Singles ===
List of singles as lead artist, with showing year released and album name
Title	Year	Album
"Project Window"	2011	non-album singles
"A Project Mind" (featuring Jay Rock and BJ the Chicago Kid)	2014	non-album singles
"1965"	2014	non-album singles
"Prelude"	2014	non-album singles
"My Darling Nikki (Interlude)"	2014	non-album singles
"25" (featuring Kendrick Lamar)	2014	non-album singles
"Fear"	2015	non-album singles
"Uninspired"	2015	non-album singles
"Kings"	2015	non-album singles
"Gone"	2016	non-album singles
"40yrs"	2016	non-album singles
"Gold"	2016	non-album singles
"Pay No Attention To The Man Behind The Curtains" (featuring Nick Grant and Lyric Michelle)	2020	TDE Fan Appreciation Week 2020

=== Guest appearances ===
List of non-single guest appearances, with other performing artists, showing year released and album name
Title	Year	Artist(s)	Album
"Blow Them Horns"	2007	K.Dot	Training Day
"Prototype"	2007	K.Dot	Training Day
"Dreams"	2007	K.Dot	Training Day
"Imagine"	2007	K.Dot, Jay Rock	Training Day
"J Dilla Freestyle"	2007	Jay Rock, K.Dot	Watts' Finest Vol. III: The Watts Riot
"Imagine"	2007	Jay Rock, K.Dot	Watts' Finest Vol. III: The Watts Riot
"Kick in the Door"	2007	K.Dot, Jay Rock	No Sleep Till NYC
"Half Way Crooks"	2007	K.Dot, Jay Rock	No Sleep Till NYC
"Try Me"	2008	ScHoolboy Q, Ab-Soul, Jay Rock, K.Dot	ScHoolboy Turned Hustla
"Menace to Society"	2008	ScHoolboy Q	ScHoolboy Turned Hustla
"Me & Ms. Pain"	2009	Ab-Soul	Longterm
"West Coast Wu Tang"	2009	K.Dot, Ab-Soul	C4
"Phone Home"	2009	K.Dot	C4
"Shot Down"	2009	K.Dot	C4
"Feelin' Myself"	2009	ScHoolboy Q	Gangsta & Soul
"Faith"	2009	Kendrick Lamar, BJ the Chicago Kid	The Kendrick Lamar EP
"Can Anybody Hear Me?"	2010	Ab-Soul	Longterm 2: Lifestyles of the Broke and Almost Famous
"I'm Good"	2011	ScHoolboy Q, BJ the Chicago Kid	Setbacks
"Time Is of the Essense"	2011	Ab-Soul	Longterm Mentality
"Cruz Control"	2011	Terrace Martin, Ill Camille	Locke High 2
"Lithium"	2011	Terrace Martin, AB, Brittany Barber	Locke High 2
"How I Live"	2012	Terrace Martin, Dom Kennedy	—N/a
"Beautiful Death"	2012	Ab-Soul, Ashtrobot	Control System
"It's Real"	2012	Terrace Martin	—N/a
"Gone"	2013	Terrace Martin, Robert Glasper, Tiffany Gouché	3ChordFold
"Dub Sac"	2014	Ab-Soul, A-Mack, SZA	These Days...
"Fly Shit"	2014	Boaz	Real Name, No Gimmicks
"Cali Get the Money"	2015	Bad Lucc	Breathe
"It's True" (Remix)	2015	BJ the Chicago Kid, Kendrick Lamar, ScHoolboy Q	—N/a
"Top of the Diamond"	2015	Bad Lucc, Problem, Ab-Soul	Diamond Lane America
"untitled 05 | 09.21.2014"	2016	Kendrick Lamar, Anna Wise, Bilal, Jay Rock, SZA	untitled unmastered.
"Lonely Soul"	2016	Ab-Soul	Do What Thou Wilt.
"São Paulo"	2017	Ill Camille, Rose Gold	Heirloom
"B.P.B."	2019	Daylyt, The Ichiban Don	Heroes
"First Responders"	2020	Kamasi Washington, Robert Glasper, Terrace Martin, 9th Wonder, Bilal	Dinner Party: Dessert
"20 Million Woolongs"	2021	Doc D	Planetory Destruction
"Goodman"	2022	Ab-Soul	Herbert
"Peace"	2024	Ab-Soul, Lupe Fiasco	Soul Burger
"Same Song"	2026	Nick Grant	—N/a
