= Malaya Watson =

American singer

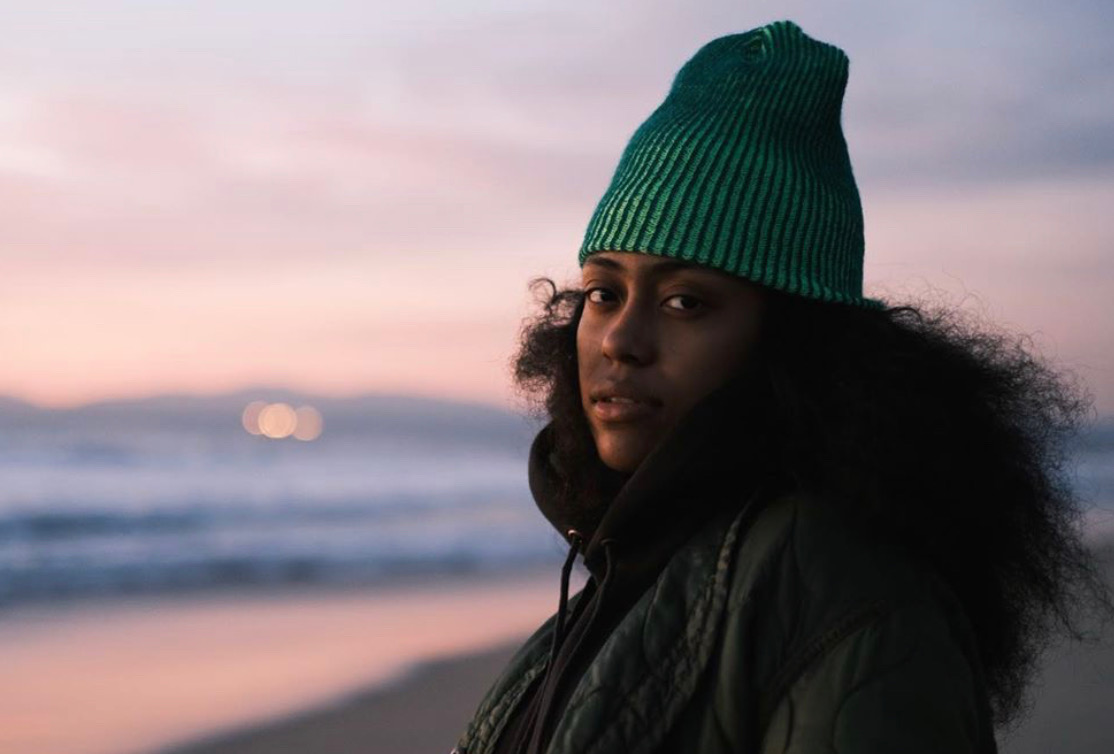
- Watson in March 2020

Background information
- Born: Malaya Tina Bandico Watson; September 24, 1997 (age 28); Southfield, Michigan, U.S.
- Genres: Soul, R&B
- Occupation: Singer
- Instruments: Vocals, tuba
- Years active: 2014–present

Malaya Tina Bandico Watson (born September 24, 1997) is an American singer from Southfield, Michigan, who finished in eighth place on the thirteenth season of American Idol.

== Early life ==
Watson is of half-Filipino American and half-African-American descent, the daughter of Ronald Watson, a professional guitar player, and Marian Bandico Watson, a nurse who hails from Manila, Philippines. In high school, she played the tuba in Southfield High School marching band. She is an alumna of the Mosaic Youth Theater of Detroit, where she sang in Singsation and Hasting Street. She is also an alumna of the Michigan Opera Theatre Children's Chorus., where she starred in Carmen, Tosca, Pied Piper of Hamlin, The Very Last Green Thing and The Nut Cracker.

== Musical influences ==
She cites her two grandfathers and her father as her personal musical influences. She described her style in singing from Sly Stone and Beyoncé.

== Career ==
=== 2014: American Idol ===
At 15, Watson auditioned in Detroit with Aretha Franklin's "Ain't No Way." She is the third youngest contestant in American Idol's history to reach the live finals after Lauren Alaina and Daniel Seavey.

After being deemed as a front-runner to win by judge Jennifer Lopez and fans, Watson was announced as the act with lowest number of votes for Top 8 reveal night. With the Judges save gone, Malaya was eliminated from the competition. She sang "I Am Changing" as her farewell song. After her final performance Watson received a final standing ovation from all three judges.

==== Performances on American Idol ====
Episode	Theme	Song choice	Original artist	Order	Result
Audition	Auditioner's Choice	"Ain't No Way"	Aretha Franklin	N/A	Advanced
Hollywood Round, Part 1	A Capella	"Brand New Me"	Alicia Keys	N/A	Advanced
Hollywood Round, Part 2	Group Performance	"I Want You Back" with Christina Collins, Olivia Diamond, and Queen Bulls	The Jackson 5	N/A	Advanced
Hollywood Round, part 3	Solo	"I Believe"	Fantasia Barrino	N/A	Advanced
Top 20 (10 Women)	Personal Choice	"Hard Times (No One Knows Better Than I)"	Ray Charles	10	Advanced
Top 13	This Is Me	"Runaway Baby"	Bruno Mars	2	Bottom 3 (Note: When Ryan Seacrest announced the results in this particular night, Watson was among the bottom 3, but was declared safe second, as Kristen O'Connor was eliminated.)
Top 12	Home	"Take Me to the King"	Tamela Mann	10	Safe
Top 11	Songs from the Cinema	"I Am Changing"	Jennifer Holliday	11	Safe
Top 10	Billboard Top 10	"When I Was Your Man"	Bruno Mars	5	Safe
Top 9	I'm with the Band!	"The Long and Winding Road"	The Beatles	4	Safe
Top 8	Back to the Start	Solo "Ain't No Way"	Aretha Franklin	6	Bottom 3 (Note: When Ryan Seacrest announced the results in this particular night, Watson was among the bottom 3, but was declared safe, as Sam Woolf was saved by the judges.)
Top 8	Back to the Start	Duet "Lucky" with Sam Woolf	Jason Mraz & Colbie Caillat	8	Bottom 3
Top 8 (Note: Due to the judges using their one save on Sam Woolf, the top 8 remained intact for another week.)	Songs from the 1980s	Solo "Through the Fire"	Chaka Khan	4	Eliminated
Top 8	Songs from the 1980s	Duet "I Knew You Were Waiting (For Me)" with C.J. Harris	Aretha Franklin & George Michael	8	Eliminated

=== Post Idol ===
Watson took part in the American Idols Live! Tour 2014 from June 24 through August 24, 2014. Throughout the duration of tour and to date, she worked on her debut EP, My Diary, and her unnamed album.

Watson sang the U.S. national anthem at the Detroit Lions versus New Orleans Saints game at Ford Field in Detroit on October 19, 2014.

In 2018, Watson released her debut single, "Time.", and released her second single "Worry About Myself" two years later in 2020. Later in the year, she appeared on Terrace Martin, Robert Glasper, 9th Wonder and Kamasi Washington's collaborative EP Dinner Party: Dessert, contributing guest vocals to the song "Love You Bad" with Phoelix.

On December 4, 2020, Watson released her debut EP, My Diary: The Prelude.. This was followed by her second EP, Father's Law, which was released the following year. Later that same year, Malaya would appear on the Terrace Martin album Drones, contributing vocals to "Evil Eye" with rapper YG. She also appeared on two tracks from Snoop Dogg's compilation Algorithm.

In 2022, Malaya was featured on the track "Joint 3" with Cisco Swank and Luke Titus, which was named by NPR as one of the year's best songs.

== Discography ==
=== EPs ===
- My Diary: The Prelude (2020)
- Father's Law (2021)

=== Digital singles (American Idol) ===
Year	Song
2014	"When I Was Your Man"
2014	"The Long and Winding Road"
2014	"Ain't No Way"
2014	"Through the Fire"

=== Singles ===
Year	Song
2018	"Time"
2020	"Worry About Myself"

=== Guest appearances ===
Title	Year	Other artist(s)	Album
"Love You Bad"	2020	Terrace Martin, Robert Glasper, 9th Wonder, Kamasi Washington, Phoelix	Dinner Party: Dessert
"Happy Feet (for dancers)"	2021	Theo Croker	BLK2LIFE // A FUTURE PAST
"Runnin Away"	2021	Tall Black Guy, Ozay Moore	Of Progress and Progression
"Evil Eyes"	2021	Terrace Martin, YG	DRONES
"Anxiety"	2021	—N/a	Algorithm
"Inspiration"	2021	—N/a	Algorithm
