= Dinner Party (EP) =

2020 EP by Dinner Party

EP by Dinner Party (Kamasi Washington, Robert Glasper, Terrace Martin and 9th Wonder)
- Released: July 10, 2020
- Recorded: 2019
- Studios: Chalice Recording Studios (Los Angeles, California)
- Genres: Jazz; jazz rap; hip-hop
- Length: 23:00
- Labels: Sounds of Crenshaw; Empire
- Producers: 9th Wonder; Kamasi Washington; Robert Glasper; Terrace Martin

Singles from Dinner Party
- 1. "Freeze Tag" Released: June 25, 2020

9th Wonder chronology
Zion IV (2019)	Dinner Party (2020)	Dinner Party: Dessert (2020)

Kamasi Washington chronology
Becoming (Music from the Netflix Original Documentary) (2020)	Dinner Party (2020)	Dinner Party: Dessert (2020)

Robert Glasper chronology
Fuck Yo Feelings (2019)	Dinner Party (2020)	Dinner Party: Dessert (2020)

Terrace Martin chronology
Impedance (2020)	Dinner Party (2020)	Dinner Party: Dessert (2020)

Dinner Party is a self titled EP by American jazz supergroup Dinner Party. It was released on July 10, 2020, via Sounds Of Crenshaw and Empire.

== Background ==
The group, consisting of musicians Kamasi Washington, Robert Glasper, Terrace Martin, and 9th Wonder recorded the project at Chalice Recording Studios in Los Angeles at the end of 2019. It features guest appearances from Chicago-based musician Phoelix. On April 14, 2023, a follow-up LP titled Enigmatic Society was made available to stream on all major platforms.

The album debuted at number one on the US Billboard Top Contemporary Jazz Albums, at number two on the Top Jazz Albums and at number fifty-five on the Top Album Sales.

It was supported by the single "Freeze Tag" alongside the music video directed by Samantha Whitehead, Brendan Walter and Jasper Graham.

== Critical reception ==
Professional ratings
Aggregate scores
Source	Rating
Metacritic	74/100
Review scores
Source	Rating
AllMusic	4/5 stars
Exclaim!	8/10
Mojo	3/5 stars
Spectrum Culture	80%
Tom Hull	B+
Under the Radar	7.5/10

Dinner Party was met with generally favorable reviews from critics. At Metacritic, which assigns a normalized rating out of 100 to reviews from mainstream publications, the album received an average score of 74 based on four reviews. The aggregator Album of the Year has the critical consensus of the album at a 75 out of 100, based on five reviews.

Writing for Exclaim!, Kevin Press said "No one's at the head of the table here. Instead we get a group of friends with genuine history and the kind of outsized talent we can only marvel at. Savour this". Spectrum Culture critic Bob Fish stated, "Everything sounds so good, a blending of genres and forces, combining the worlds of jazz and hip hop, they create the kind of brew that is easy on the ears". AllMusic's Andy Kellman wrote, "The brief set overall evokes some of the same feelings as 9th's Black Radio Recovered remix of "Afro Blue", Kendrick's "These Walls", and much of Martin's Velvet Portraits, all connected and nutritive recordings offering solace and strength. There's no crosstalk, just completed thoughts". Caleb Campbell of Under the Radar said, "Even when the record leaves listeners wishing for just a bit more, it is hard to be that disappointed by an album filled with lush performances from some of the best musicians in their genre".

== Track listing ==
All lyrics are written by Kamasi Washington, Robert Glasper, Terrace Martin and Patrick Douthit, except for tracks 1–3 and 6 written with Michael E. Neil; all music is composed by Kamasi Washington, Robert Glasper, Terrace Martin and Patrick Douthit.

No.	Title	Length
1.	"Sleepless Nights" (featuring Phoelix)	2:59
2.	"Love You Bad" (featuring Phoelix)	2:48
3.	"From My Heart and My Soul" (featuring Phoelix)	2:30
4.	"First Responders"	4:49
5.	"The Mighty Tree"	2:54
6.	"Freeze Tag" (featuring Phoelix)	3:11
7.	"Luv U"	3:49
Total length:		23:03

Sample credits

- "Sleepless Nights" contains a sample of "Can't Breathe", as performed by 9th Wonder featuring Smitty.
- "Love You Bad" contains a sample of "It's Something", written by David Foster and Brenda Russell, as performed by Donna Washington.
- "From My Heart and My Soul" uses the "Oasis" instrumental by 9th Wonder.
- "First Responders" contains a sample of "Ghetto Lament", written by Tommy Smith and Weldon Irvine, as performed by Sylvia St. James; and "Gang Progress", written and performed by André Ceccarelli.
- "Freeze Tag" contains a sample of "Just to Be Somebody", written by Harvey Fuqua and Vernon Bullock, as performed by New Birth.
- "Luv U" contains a sample of "He Can't Love U", written by Brian Casey, Brandon Casey and Bryan-Michael Cox, as performed by Jagged Edge.

== Personnel ==
- 9th Wonder – producer (tracks: 1–4, 6–7), music programming (all tracks)
- Robert Glasper – producer (tracks: all), acoustic piano (1, 6), electric piano (2–3), Fender Rhodes (4, 7)
- Terrace Martin – producer (tracks: all), alto saxophone (2–7), mini-moog synth (1, 3, 5–6), additional keyboards (4–5), vocoder (7)
- Kamasi Washington – producer (tracks: all), tenor saxophone (1–6), additional keyboards (7)
- Phoelix – lead vocals (tracks: 1–3, 6), additional vocals (5)
- Marlon Williams – guitar (tracks: all)
- Amani Washington – artwork
- Bryan DiMaio – engineering, mixing (tracks: all)

== Dinner Party: Dessert ==
Dinner Party: Dessert

Remix album by Dinner Party (Kamasi Washington, Robert Glasper, Terrace Martin and 9th Wonder)
- Released: October 9, 2020
- Recorded: 2020
- Length: 20:34
- Labels: Sounds of Crenshaw; Empire
- Producers: 9th Wonder; Kamasi Washington; Robert Glasper; Terrace Martin

Dinner Party (Kamasi Washington, Robert Glasper, Terrace Martin and 9th Wonder) chronology
Dinner Party (2020)	Dinner Party: Dessert (2020)	Enigmatic Society (2023)

9th Wonder chronology
Dinner Party (2020)	Dinner Party: Dessert (2020)	Zion V: The Ballad of Charles Douthit (2020)

Kamasi Washington chronology
Dinner Party (2020)	Dinner Party: Dessert (2020)	Enigmatic Society (2023)

Robert Glasper chronology
Dinner Party (2020)	Dinner Party: Dessert (2020)	Black Radio III (2022)

Terrace Martin chronology
Dinner Party (2020)	Dinner Party: Dessert (2020)	Village Days (2020)

Dinner Party: Dessert is a collaborative remix EP by American hip-hop supergroup Dinner Party (consisting of Kamasi Washington, Robert Glasper, Terrace Martin and 9th Wonder). Released on October 9, 2020, via Sounds of Crenshaw/Empire, the EP serves as an alternate version of the original EP from July, with a wider range of guest artists such as Buddy, Punch, Bilal, Rapsody and Snoop Dogg contributing to the EP's original seven tracks. The EP was nominated for Best Progressive R&B Album at the 64th Annual Grammy Awards.

=== Track listing ===
All lyrics are written by Kamasi Washington, Robert Glasper, Terrace Martin and Patrick Douthit, except where noted; all music is composed by Kamasi Washington, Robert Glasper, Terrace Martin and Patrick Douthit.

Dinner Party: Dessert track listing
No.	Title	Writer(s)	Length
1.	"Sleepless Nights" (featuring Buddy, Reuben Vincent and Phoelix)	Simmie Sims III; Reuben Vincent; Michael E. Neil	3:59
2.	"Love You Bad" (featuring Malaya and Phoelix)	Malaya Watson; Neil	2:15
3.	"From My Heart and My Soul" (featuring Tank and the Bangas and Phoelix)	Tarriona "Tank" Ball; Neil	2:32
4.	"First Responders" (featuring Punch and Bilal)	Terrence Henderson; Bilal Oliver	3:02
5.	"The Mighty Tree" (featuring Herbie Hancock and Rapsody)	Herbie Hancock; Marlanna Evans	2:17
6.	"Freeze Tag" (featuring Cordae and Phoelix)	Neil; Cordae Dunston	3:11
7.	"LUV U" (featuring Snoop Dogg and Alex Isley)	Calvin Cordozar Broadus Jr.; Alexandra Isley	3:18
Total length:			20:34

== Charts ==
Chart performance for Dinner Party
Chart (2020–2022)	Peak position
Belgian Albums (Ultratop Wallonia)	134
US Top Contemporary Jazz Albums (Billboard)	1
US Top Jazz Albums (Billboard)	2
US Top Album Sales (Billboard)	55
