= Dinner Party (Jazz/hip-hop supergroup) =

Jazz Hip-hop supergroup

- Origin: Los Angeles, California
- Genres: Jazz; Hip-hop; Soul; R&B
- Years active: 2019– present
- Label: Sounds of Crenshaw/EMPIRE
- Award: Best Progressive R&B Album Nomination for Dinner Party: Dessert at the 64th Annual Grammy Awards
- Members: Terrace Martin; Robert Glasper; Kamasi Washington; 9th Wonder

Dinner Party is a Jazz, Soul, R&B, and Hip-hop supergroup composed of multi-instrumentalist Terrace Martin, pianist Robert Glasper , jazz saxophonist Kamasi Washington, and Hip-hop record producer 9th Wonder. The relationships among many of the band members are decades old. Martin and Washington have been friends since 1992, meeting in high school jazz band at an elite LA arts school, Martin and Glasper have been friends since they met at jazz camp in 1996, and 9th Wonder had produced one of Glasper's albums, Black Radio.

Glasper and Martin came up with the idea of creating Dinner Party in 2019 while touring together in London. The group formed their jazz hip-hop sound when Martin, Glasper, and Washington all worked on Kendrick Lamar's album To Pimp a Butterfly. 9th Wonder shares this sensibility from his work on Kendrick Lamar's single Duckworth.

Dinner Party recorded their debut album the Dinner Party (EP) at Chalice Studios in Los Angeles at the end of 2019. The band usually works by first having 9th Wonder send beat ideas to Terrace Martin. Martin would then work with Washington and Glasper in the studio, in Los Angeles, to form the rough ideas into fully formed songs.

The group's music is influenced by Marvin Gaye. In the 1970s Marvin Gaye produced the soul protest song “What's Going On”. In 2020, as their first single, Dinner Party released socially conscious jazz hip-hop song Freeze Tag.

Dinner Party has released 4 albums, Dinner Party (EP), Dinner Party: Dessert, Enigmatic Society, and Whatchu Bringing?. Whatchu Bringing?, the most recent, was released on August 7, 2026. Dinner Party: Dessert was nominated for a Grammy at the 64th Annual Grammy Awards in the category of Best Progressive R&B Album, ultimately losing to Lucky Daye's Table for Two.

== Dinner Party (EP) ==
Main Article: Dinner Party (EP)

The single, Freeze Tag, released June 25, 2020 preceded the release of the Dinner Party (EP). Dinner Party released their self-titled EP on July 10, 2020. Including Freeze Tag, the rapper Phoelix is featured in 5 of the album's 7 songs.

== Dinner Party: Dessert ==
Main article: Dinner Party: Dessert

Dinner Party: Dessert was released on October 9, 2020. The album is a remix of their debut album. Dinner Party: Dessert brings in many other artists as collaborators including jazz pianist Herbie Hancock and rapper Snoop Dogg as a narrator. Dinner Party: Dessert was nominated for the Best Progressive R&B Album for the 64th Annual Grammy Awards, ultimately losing to Lucky Daye's Table for Two.

== Enigmatic Society ==
Main Article: Enigmatic Society

Dinner Party released a single, For Granted, featuring neo-soul singer Arin Ray. It was released on April 7, 2023 to support the release of their upcoming album. Dinner Party released Enigmatic Society on April 14, 2023. Like Dinner Party's debut EP, group member Kamasi Washington's sister, Amani, did the artwork for the album cover on Enigmatic Society.

== Whatchu Bringing? ==
Main Article: Whatchu Bringing?

Whatchu Bringing? is the third release by the American jazz and hip-hop supergroup Dinner Party. The album was released on August 7, 2026, through Empire and Sounds of Crenshaw. The lead single "If It Ain’t Broke (Love Wins)" was released on July 10th.
