= Herbert (album) =

Studio album by Ab-Soul
- Released: December 16, 2022
- Recorded: 2022
- Genre: West Coast hip-hop
- Length: 66:23
- Label: TDE
- Producer: Axlfolie; Beach Noise; James Blake; Boi-1da; Jake Bowman; Andrew Boyd; Greg Cortez; Crooklin; DJ Dahi; DJ Premier; Connor McElwain; Dylan Graham; Nick Hakim; Hit-Boy; Amaire Johnson; Juju the Fool; Kal Banx; Kurtis McKenzie; No_L; Pilgrim; Poptartpete; Python P; Rascal; Jacob Rochester; Sounwave; Luca Starz; Super Miles; Jahaan Sweet; Tae Beast

Ab-Soul chronology
Do What Thou Wilt. (2016)	Herbert (2022)	Soul Burger (2024)

Singles from Herbert
- 1. "Hollandaise" Released: April 22, 2022; 2. "Moonshooter" Released: September 16, 2022; 3. "Do Better" Released: October 21, 2022; 4. "Gang'Nem" Released: November 18, 2022

Herbert ratings
Review scores
Source	Rating
The Needle Drop	6/10
Pitchfork	6/10
Spectrum Culture	45%
Under the Radar	6/10 stars

Herbert is the fifth studio album by American rapper Ab-Soul. It was released on December 16, 2022, by Top Dawg Entertainment (TDE). It features guest appearances by Ambré, Alemeda, Big Sean, Fre$h, Jhené Aiko, Joey Badass, Lance Skiiiwalker, Punch, Russ, SiR and Zacari. It includes notable productions by Boi-1da, DJ Dahi, DJ Premier, Hit-Boy, Jahaan Sweet, James Blake and Sounwave, among others. Titled after Ab-Soul's birth name, Herbert Anthony Stevens IV, the album marks his return to music after a six-year absence following Do What Thou Wilt. in December 2016.

== Background and release ==
On April 22, 2022, Ab-Soul released "Hollandaise", the lead single from his then-upcoming yet-to-be-titled album.

On September 16, 2022, he released the second single from the album titled "Moonshooter", which he co-wrote with his TDE label-mate Zacari. With the future release of the album, the song would eventually include a feature by fellow American rapper Joey Badass.

On October 21, 2022, he released the album's third single, "Do Better", which features a guest appearance by Zacari. A black-and-white music video directed by Omar Jones was released for the single the same day.

On November 18, 2022, he announced via Twitter that his next album Herbert would be released on December 16, 2022. He also released the fourth single "Gang'Nem", which features Fresh, a frequent collaborator of Ab-Soul.

On December 7, 2022, he officially unveiled the cover art and the tracklist for the album.

== Track listing ==
No.	Title	Lyrics	Music	Producer(s)	Length
1.	"Message in a Bottle" (with Lance Skiiiwalker)	Herbert Anthony Stevens IV; Gregory Behr; Miles Franklin; Jake Kosich; Johnny Kosich; Lance Howard; Phillip Rodrian; Matthew Schaeffer; Luca Starz	Behr; Jake Kosich; Johnny Kosich; Rodrian; Luca Starz	Super Miles; Beach Noise; Luca Starz; Juju the Fool; No_L; Rory Behr^{[a]}	4:39
2.	"No Report Card"	Stevens	Tobias Breuer; Donte Perkins	Tae Beast; Pilgrim; Rascal; Rory Behr^{[a]}	2:50
3.	"Hollandaise"	Stevens	Kalon Berry; Russel Scoot-Wood	Crooklin; Kal Banx	4:19
4.	"Moonshooter" (with Joey Badass)	Stevens; Jo-Vaughn Virginie Scott	Jamal Smith	Poptartpete	4:13
5.	"Fomf"	Stevens	Matthew Jehu Samuels; Mark Anthony Spears	Boi-1da; Sounwave	2:40
6.	"Goodman" (with Punch)	Stevens; Willie Clarke; Terrence Louis Henderson, Jr.; Clarence Reid	Andrew Boyd; Kevin Pennington	Python P; Andrew Boyd	3:28
7.	"Do Better" (with Zacari)	Stevens; Zacari Moses Pacaldo I	Stevens; Nicolas Hakim; Kurtis McKenzie; Dacourey Dahi Natche; Pacaldo	DJ Dahi; Kurtis McKenzie; Nick Hakim	3:51
8.	"Gang'Nem" (with Fresh)	Stevens; Supreme Williams	Jake Kosich; Johnny Kosich; Markeith Nelson; Schaeffer; Spears	Sounwave; Beach Noise^{[c]}; Ayoo Meco^{[a]}	4:10
9.	"The Wild Side" (with Jhené Aiko)	Stevens; Jhené Aiko Efuru Chilombo; Axel Morgan	Dylan Graham; Miles Franklin	Super Miles; Axlfolie; Dylan Graham	2:55
10.	"Art of Seduction" (with Ambré)	Stevens; Connan Hosford	Jahaan Sweet; Samuels; Spears	Boi-1da; Sounwave; Jahaan Sweet	3:23
11.	"Bucket"	Stevens; Gerloni Cotton; Johnny McKinzie Jr.	Jake Kosich; Johnny Kosich; Jacob Rochester	Jacob Rochester; Beach Noise	3:05
12.	"Go Off" (with Russ and Big Sean)	Stevens; Sean Michael Leonard Anderson; Russell James Vitale	Amaire Johnson	Johnson	4:27
13.	"Fallacy" (with Alemeda)	Stevens; Rahema Alameda; Caelon Nishay; Caelon Reed	Chauncey Alexander Hollis Jr.	Hit-Boy	3:33
14.	"Herbert"	Stevens; Kendrick Lamar Duckworth	Jake Kosich; Johnny Kosich; James Blake Litherland; Schaeffer	James Blake; Beach Noise	3:50
15.	"Church on the Move"	Stevens	Thomas Barrett; McKenzie; Natche	DJ Dahi; Curtis McKenzie	2:46
16.	"It Be Like That" (with Sir)	Stevens; Sir Darryl Farris	Jake Bowman; Jordan Brooks; Greg Cortez; Connor McElwain; Perkins	Tae Beast; Jake Bowman; Greg Cortez; Connor McElwain	4:19
17.	"Positive Vibes Only"	Stevens; Pacaldo; Tierra Wilson	Natche; Ely Rise	DJ Dahi	3:52
18.	"Gotta Rap"	Stevens	Christopher Edward Martin	DJ Premier	4:03
Total length:					66:23

Notes

- ^{^[c]} signifies a co-producer.
- ^{^[a]} signifies an assistant producer.

== Personnel ==
Musicians

- Ab-Soul – vocals
- Anthony "Top Dawg" Tiffith – background vocals (track 1)
- Helen Anderson – background vocals (1)
- Richard Gray – background vocals (2)
- Umi – background vocals (2, 17)
- Maurice David – background vocals (3)
- Ambré – background vocals (5, 10)
- Rich the Kid – background vocals (5)
- Schoolboy Q – background vocals (5)
- Henry Was – bass (6)
- Amaire Johnson – strings (7)
- David Young – trumpet (7)
- Gionardo Burg – background vocals (8)
- Markeith Nelson – background vocals (8)
- Russ – background vocals (9, 16)
- Danielle Rich – background vocals (10)
- Jay Rock – background vocals (11)
- Armani – background vocals (13)
- Noleac Yashin – background vocals (13, 15)
- Jasmine "Sistar Outspoken" Pitcher – background vocals (14)
- Kendrick Lamar – background vocals (14)
- Yaris Sanchez – background vocals (14)
- Kailey Galvin – background vocals (15)
- Kiera Gavin – background vocals (15)
- Jordan Brooks – bass (16)
- Phillip Whack – trumpet (16)
- Zacari – background vocals (17)

Technical

- Nicolas De Porcel – mastering
- Andrew Boyd – mixing, engineering
- Rory Behr – mixing, engineering
- James Hunt – mixing (3, 4, 7, 14, 15)
- Sedrick Moore II – engineering (1, 9, 11, 13)
- Bert Gervis – engineering (4, 7)
- Hari Bhatt – engineering (6)
- Keaton Smith – engineering (10, 11)
- Milan Beker – engineering (12)
- Tom Kahre – engineering (12)
- Arnulfo Reyes III – engineering (13)
- King of Chill – engineering (18)
- Parks & Nef – engineering (18)
- Sir Darryl Farris – engineering (16)
- Demitrius Lewis II – mastering assistance
- Ashod Oshagan – additional engineering (3)
- Devin Ragsdale – engineering assistance (8)
