= All My Life (In the Ghetto) =

Single by Jay Rock featuring Lil Wayne and will.i.am

from the album Follow Me Home
- Released: October 16, 2008
- Genre: West Coast hip-hop
- Length: 3:48
- Label: Top Dawg Entertainment; Asylum; Warner Bros.
- Songwriter(s): Johnny McKinzie; Andre Lyon; Dwayne Carter, Jr.; Marcello Valenzano; William Adams, Jr.
- Producer(s): Cool & Dre

Jay Rock singles chronology
"All My Life (In the Ghetto)" (2008)	"Hood Gone Love It" (2011)

Lil Wayne singles chronology
"I'm So Paid" (2008)	"All My Life (In the Ghetto)" (2008)	"Turnin Me On" (2008)

will.i.am singles chronology
"What's Your Name" (2008)	"All My Life (In the Ghetto)" (2008)	"3 Words" (2009)

"All My Life (In the Ghetto)" is a song by American hip-hop recording artist Jay Rock, released October 16, 2008, as his commercial debut single and the lead single from his debut studio album, Follow Me Home (2011). The song, which was released under Top Dawg Entertainment (TDE) and Warner Bros. Records, was produced by American production team Cool & Dre and features vocals from fellow American rappers, Lil Wayne and will.i.am.

== Background ==
The song originally leaked online featuring a different chorus sung by West Coast rapper K. Dot (now known as Kendrick Lamar) and Dre (of production team Cool & Dre). Lil Wayne's appearance came after he listened to one of Jay Rock's mixtapes.

== Music video ==
The music video was filmed in Rock's hometown of Watts, Los Angeles. The music video features Jay Rock walking around his old neighborhood or on a billboard, rapping alongside Lil Wayne. will.i.am does not appear in the video, however, despite this, the video features cameo appearances from Rock's TDE label-mates and then-unknown fellow West Coast rappers, Ab-Soul and Kendrick Lamar.

== Remixes ==
The official remix was released on February 18, 2010, and features rappers Game, Gorilla Zoe and Busta Rhymes. A "West Coast Mega Remix" begins with a new verse by Jay Rock, followed by guest verses in the following order: Eastwood, Omar Cruz, Schoolboy Q, Ab-Soul, Glasses Malone, Crooked I, Nipsey Hussle, Sinful, Ya Boy, Roccett, Terry Kennedy, Problem, Keno, Spider Loc, 2 Eleven, Bangloose, Mistah F.A.B. and Roscoe Umali (K-Dot is listed but does not actually appear). Nipsey Hussle freestyled over the beat for his mixtape Bullets Ain't Got No Name, Vol. 3, as well as Wiz Khalifa for his Burn After Rolling mixtape.

== Critical reception ==
"All My Life (In the Ghetto)" was met with generally positive reviews from music critics. Nathan Slavik of DJBooth called the song, "a soulful yet street oriented single that still serves as the best indication of heights Rock is capable of reaching."

== Charts ==
Chart (2008)	Peak position
US Bubbling Under R&B/Hip-Hop Singles (Billboard)	10
