= Black Friday (Jay Rock mixtape) =

Mixtape by Jay Rock
- Released: November 26, 2010
- Recorded: 2010
- Genre: Hip hop
- Labels: TDE; Strange
- Producers: Jay Rock (exec); Sounwave; DJ Khalil; Crada; L.E.S.; Dem Jointz; Dangeroo Kipawaa; Focus…; Phoenix; Mr. Lee; Willie B; Wyldfyer; Paperboy Fabe

Jay Rock chronology
From Hood Tales to the Cover of XXL (2010)	Black Friday (2010)	Follow Me Home (2011)

Black Friday is the eighth mixtape by American rapper Jay Rock. It was released on November 26, 2010, for free download and then on December 7, 2010, via iTunes and Amazon.com, by Top Dawg Entertainment (TDE) via Strange Music. It was Jay Rock's last mixtape before the release of his debut studio album Follow Me Home.

== Background ==
The mixtape was interactive as it gained some of its tracks thanks to fans' feedback on Twitter and fans also helped shape the album cover. Music videos were released for "No Joke", "Diary of a Broke Nigga" and "Get on Your Shit".

== Lyrics, production and themes ==
The lyrics stay true to the typical rags-to-riches street narrative style, adding a sense of regularity to the mixtape, though it rarely crosses over into redundancy, thanks to Jay Rock's delivery.

The production embodies astral atmospheric sounds that evoke feelings of an urban cement dreamscape over the traditional hip-hop elements. "Walk with Me" production was described as trademark G-Funk synth on steady loop over the deep groove of drums and bass.

The mixtapes themes were described as "street" related and Rock's rapping was described as "reality rap". Ology described the mixtape as a "street narrative"

== Guests and production ==
The mixtape features guest appearances from Black Hippy members Kendrick Lamar, Schoolboy Q and Ab-Soul along with Big Scoob, Trae Tha Truth and Spider Loc among others. The production was handled by Focus..., Crada and DJ Khalil, as well as in-house producers from Top Dawg Entertainment, such as Willie B and Sounwave, representing Digi+Phonics.

== Critical reception ==
Black Friday received critical acclaim upon its release. It was named the 83rd best mixtape of 2010 by XXL and described as a "banger". Ab-Soul's features were widely praised by critics.

== Track listing ==
No.	Title	Producer(s)	Length
1.	"No Joke" (featuring Ab-Soul)	Willie B	4:17
2.	"Diary of a Broke Nigga" (featuring Kendrick Lamar and Giddy)	Crada	3:37
3.	"Still in the Hood" (featuring Trae)	Dem Jointz	3:54
4.	"Fuck the Police" (featuring Ab-Soul)	Dangeroo Kipawaa	2:54
5.	"Juice"	Sounwave	3:35
6.	"They Say" (featuring Kendrick Lamar)	Phoenix	4:03
7.	"Walk with Me" (featuring Big Scoob)	Mr. Lee	3:17
8.	"In These Streets" (featuring Spider Loc)	Paperboy Fabe	4:15
9.	"Hustle Man" (featuring Ab-Soul)	Dangeroo Kipawaa	3:25
10.	"Money Makin' Moves" (featuring Ab-Soul)	Dangeroo Kipawaa	4:27
11.	"Trapped in the Hood"	Wyldfyer; L.E.S.	3:00
12.	"Get on Your Shit"	Focus...	3:56
13.	"Kush Freestyle" (Bonus Track)	DJ Khalil	2:11
14.	"Shadow of Death" (performed by Black Hippy) (Bonus Track)	Sounwave	3:39

Samples

- "Still in the Hood" samples "Fully Loaded Clip" by 50 Cent.
- "Kush Freestyle" samples "Kush" by Dr. Dre.
- "Diary of a Broke Nigga" samples "What's Your Name" by The Moments.
- "Shadow of Death" samples "Dance Music" by R. D. Burman.
