= Enigmatic Society =

EP by Dinner Party
- Released: April 14, 2023
- Studios: Organic Grease Studios (Los Angeles, CA); Larrabee Sound Studios (Los Angeles, CA); Electric Lady Studios (New York City)
- Genres: R&B; jazz
- Length: 24:51
- Labels: Sounds of Crenshaw; EMPIRE
- Producers: 9th Wonder; Hi-Tek; Robert Glasper; Sounwave; Terrace Martin; Trevor Lawrence Jr.

Dinner Party chronology
Dinner Party (2020)	Enigmatic Society (2023)	Whatchu Bringing? (2026)

Singles from Enigmatic Society
- 1. "Insane" Released: March 9, 2023

9th Wonder chronology
The Don & Eye (2022)	Enigmatic Society (2023)	Don & Eye 2 (2023)

Kamasi Washington chronology
Dinner Party: Dessert (2020)	Enigmatic Society (2023)	Fearless Movement (2024)

Robert Glasper chronology
Black Radio III (2022)	Enigmatic Society (2023)	In December (2023)

Terrace Martin chronology
Drones (2021)	Enigmatic Society (2023)	Fine Tune (2023)

Enigmatic Society is the second extended play by American jazz supergroup Dinner Party. It was released on April 14, 2023, via Sounds Of Crenshaw/Empire Distribution. Recording sessions took place at Organic Grease Studios and Larrabee Sound Studios in Los Angeles and Electric Lady Studios in New York City. Production was handled by members Terrace Martin, 9th Wonder and Robert Glasper, as well as Hi-Tek, Sounwave and Trevor Lawrence Jr. It features guest appearances from Phoelix, Arin Ray, Ant Clemons and Tank.

The album debuted at number 17 on the Top Jazz Albums and number 4 on the Top Contemporary Jazz Albums in the United States. It was supported by single "Insane" with an accompanying animated music video directed by Juppi Juppsen.

== Critical reception ==
Professional ratings
Aggregate scores
Source	Rating
Metacritic	70/100
Review scores
Source	Rating
AllMusic	3.5/5 stars
Clash	8/10
Pitchfork	7.6/10
The Observer	4/5 stars
Tom Hull	B

Enigmatic Society was met with generally favourable reviews from music critics. At Metacritic, which assigns a normalized rating out of 100 to reviews from mainstream publications, the album received an average score of 70 based on five reviews.

Robin Murray of Clash praised the album, saying "finessed and unified, Enigmatic Society is magnificent, a micro-masterpiece that refuses to be pigeonholed. Free-thinking yet direct, it's a salute to collaborative art, and the geniuses behind it". Kate Hutchinson of The Observer stated: "while many mainstream acts lean on jazzists to lend some flair, it's rare that it goes the other way. But Dinner Party bring serious chops to contemporary music's top table". Ben Cardew of Pitchfork resumed: "the whole is stronger than the sum of its parts". AllMusic's Andy Kellman found it "neither as powerful nor as weighty as the debut, and certainly doesn't seem intended to match it in those regards. It's altogether a calmer, more romantic work".

In the mixed review for The Wire, the critic concluded: "this is pleasant but forgettable music, dissolving the instant it hits the eardrum".

== Track listing ==
No.	Title	Writer(s)	Producer(s)	Length
1.	"Answered Prayer" (featuring Phoelix)	Michael E. Neil; Terrace Martin; Robert Glasper	Terrace Martin; Robert Glasper	2:22
2.	"Breathe" (featuring Arin Ray)	Arin Ray; Martin; Glasper; Kamasi Washington; Patrick Douthit	Terrace Martin; 9th Wonder	3:09
3.	"Insane" (featuring Ant Clemons)	Anthony Clemons Jr.; Martin; Glasper; Washington; Mark Anthony Spears; James Forman	Terrace Martin; Sounwave	2:51
4.	"Watts Renaissance"	Martin; Washington; Tony Cottrell	Terrace Martin; Hi-Tek	2:49
5.	"For Granted" (featuring Arin Ray)	Neil; Martin; Glasper; Washington; Douthit	Terrace Martin; 9th Wonder	2:51
6.	"Secure" (featuring Phoelix and Tank)	Neil; Durrell Babbs; Martin	Terrace Martin	2:39
7.	"Can't Go" (featuring Phoelix)	Neil; Martin; Glasper; Washington; Douthit; Daryl Hall; John Oates; Sara Allen	Terrace Martin; 9th Wonder	2:44
8.	"The Lower East Side"	Martin; Washington; Trevor Lawrence Jr.	Terrace Martin; Trevor Lawrence Jr.	2:52
9.	"Love Love" (featuring Arin Ray)	Neil; Martin; Glasper; Douthit	Terrace Martin; 9th Wonder; Robert Glasper	2:34
Total length:				24:51

== Personnel ==
- Terrace Martin – soprano saxophone (track 1), keyboards (tracks: 2, 5), bass (tracks: 2, 5, 7), alto saxophone (tracks: 3, 5, 7), additional keyboards (track 3), vocoder (tracks: 6, 9), ARP Odyssey and Minimoog synthesizers (track 6), producer, recording (tracks: 1, 2, 4–9), mixing
- Robert Glasper – piano (tracks: 1, 3), keyboards (tracks: 2, 5, 7, 9), producer (tracks: 1, 9)
- Kamasi Washington – tenor saxophone (tracks: 2, 3, 5, 7)
- Patrick "9th Wonder" Douthit – producer (tracks: 2, 5, 7, 9)
- Michael E. "Phoelix" Neil – vocals (tracks: 1, 6, 7), additional vocals (tracks: 5, 9)
- Arin Ray – vocals (tracks: 2, 5, 9)
- Anthony "Ant" Clemons Jr. – vocals (track 3)
- Durrell "Tank" Babbs – vocals (track 6)
- Mark "Sounwave" Spears – drums & producer (track 3)
- Marlon Williams – guitar (track 7)
- Tony "Hi-Tek" Cottrell – producer & recording (track 4)
- Trevor Lawrence Jr. – producer (track 8)
- Phillip Cornish – additional programming (tracks: 2, 5, 7, 9)
- Piéce Eatah – recording (tracks: 1, 3, 5, 7)
- Dondre Adams – recording (tracks: 1, 5–7, 9)
- John Muller – recording (tracks: 2, 4, 5, 9)
- Christopher Pegram – recording (track 3)
- Dylan Del-Olmo – recording (track 3)
- Rick Carson – recording (track 8), mastering
- Bryan DiMaio – mixing
- Keith "Qmillion" Lewis – mixing (track 3)
- Dani Perez – engineering assistant (tracks: 2, 4, 5, 9)
- Ryan Harvey – engineering assistant (track 8)
- Amani Washington – artwork

== Charts ==
Chart performance for Enigmatic Society
Chart (2023)	Peak position
US Top Jazz Albums (Billboard)	17
US Top Contemporary Jazz Albums (Billboard)	4
