= Do What Thou Wilt. =

Studio album by Ab-Soul
- Released: December 9, 2016
- Recorded: 2015–2016
- Genre: Hip hop
- Length: 76:57
- Label: TDE
- Producer: Antydote; ASAP P on the Boards; Bentley Haze; DJ Fu; FrancisGotHeat; Juice of All Trades; Mike Will Made It; Pakk Music Group; Rahki; Skhye Hutch; Sounwave; TaeBeast; Tommy Black; Willie B; WondaGurl

Ab-Soul chronology
These Days... (2014)	Do What Thou Wilt. (2016)	Herbert (2022)

Singles from Do What Thou Wilt.
- 1. "Huey Knew" Released: September 30, 2016; 2. "Braille" Released: October 28, 2016

Do What Thou Wilt. is the fourth studio album by American rapper Ab-Soul. It was released on December 9, 2016, by Top Dawg Entertainment (TDE). The record serves as the follow-up to his previous studio effort, These Days... (2014). The album was supported by two singles: "Huey Knew" and "Braille".

== Background ==
In 2007, Ab-Soul signed a deal with Top Dawg Entertainment. In 2014, after the release of his third album, These Days... through the TDE label, Ab-Soul embarked on a national concert tour. Upon returning from the tour, Ab-Soul began recording new material as early as February 2015. On July 14, 2015, Ab-Soul gave more updates on the album: "My album's almost done..." he wrote on Twitter, adding, "It's a love story". He completed the post with the hashtag "DWTW", presumably the acronym to his album title, to which he kept alluding. On June 8, 2016, Ab-Soul revealed that he had finished the new album and then turned it in for audio mixing.

In December 2016, in an interview with HotNewHipHop, Ab-Soul spoke on the album's cover artwork, revealing why he's not featured with his trademark sunglasses: "With the light sensitivity, I knew it would be difficult, but I was up to the challenge. I knew that it was something that the people wanted to see from me. I like to bare it all. I'm very honest. I think this album kinda called for that type of sincerity." He said the photographer wanted to "capture his angst" but "I'm a happy guy," he said, smiling. "But the tone of the album, you can get that from it. I think that that cover is a proper depiction of... the tone of the album. It's the grey area."

In a December 2016 interview, with Hypebeast, Ab-Soul shared the title comes from a quote from English occultist Aleister Crowley:

Yeah, that is a famous quote from Mr. Crowley. To me, it translates to free will. Not necessarily 'do what you wanna do'—'cause that's kinda chaotic—but do what you will to do. Will being stronger than a want. Something that's supported by love and passion. That's what that quote means to me, and you know I'm a man of quotes. That's just one of those that resonated with me the most.

== Release and promotion ==
On December 5, 2016, Ab-Soul announced on his Twitter feed that DWTW was scheduled to be released on December 9, 2016. The announcement of the release date coincided with the release of the song "Threatening Nature", on TDE's SoundCloud page. On December 6, Ab-Soul unveiled the album's cover art and track-listing. On December 7, 2016, Ab-Soul released the music video, directed by PANAMÆRA, for a song titled "D.R.U.G.S." On December 13, 2016, Ab-Soul released another music video, this one directed by APLUS Filmz, for the album's intro, "RAW (backwards)".

"Huey Knew" was released on September 30, 2016, as the album's lead single. It features production by TDE's in-house producer Willie B, as well as a guest appearance from New Jersey–based rapper Dash. The music video for "Huey Knew", was released on October 14, 2016. "Huey Knew" is listed as "Huey Knew THEN" on the album's track-listing. Ab-Soul released the album's second single, titled "Braille", on October 28, 2016. The song features a guest appearance from New York City–based rapper Bas, while the production was handled by WondaGurl. On November 22, 2016, the music video for "Braille", which was directed by PANAMÆRA, was released.

== Critical reception ==
Professional ratings
Aggregate scores
Source	Rating
Metacritic	64/100
Review scores
Source	Rating
Exclaim!	6/10
HipHopDX	4.2/5
HotNewHipHop	78%
Pitchfork	4.4/10
PopMatters	6/10
RapReviews	6.5/10
Vice	A−
XXL	4/5

Do What Thou Wilt. was met with generally positive reviews. At Metacritic, which assigns a normalized rating out of 100 to reviews from mainstream publications, the album received an average score of 64, based on six reviews.

Ural Garrett of HipHopDX said, "Ab-Soul expounds on his cranial compound Do What Thou Wilt and fully revealed himself as an artist who plays mind games with himself and listeners. Although figuring Soulo lyrical intent continues to be a guessing game, at least there are some critical takeaways that linger far after indulging in the music." Michael G. Barilleaux of RapReviews said, "For those who like a swell show of technical strength, a spin of this album will occupy your listen to and from the workplace quite well. For those seeking something more meaningful to go along with their skill showcase, however, don't feel bad about taking a pass on this one." In Vice, Robert Christgau said Ab-Soul's music "emanates intellectual excitement and pleasure as he grows up", highlighting the rapper's "feminist-curious yearnings" while remaining ambivalent toward his "tree-huffing doggishness". Christgau deemed the record, "as listening, more fun than his fellow Black Hippy's outtakes for sure. As wordplay too. As thinking, leaves room for improvement and reason to hope there'll be some."

Scott Glaysher of XXL said, "The kind of God level rapping that Ab-Soul showcases on Do What Thou Wilt means this album will exist predominantly in the headphones of those shrewd enough to understand." Calum Slingerland of Exclaim! said, "Ab-Soul is more successful when he mines his own sorrow." Dan Kok of PopMatters said, "It's an album that embodies the idea of potential that isn't fully realized." Pitchfork journalist Sheldon Pearce was less receptive, regarding the songs as overly abstract, meaningless riddles. He believed Ab-Soul had become "so information-obsessed that he loses sight of actual meaning", while panning what he said were Aleister Crowley-inspired occult references.

== Track listing ==
Do What Thou Wilt. track listing
No.	Title	Writer(s)	Producer(s)	Length
1.	"RAW (backwards)" (featuring Zacari)	Herbert Anthony Stevens IV; Zacari Moses Pacaldo I	Juice of All Trades	4:45
2.	"Braille" (featuring Bas)	Stevens; Abbas Hammad; Ebony Naomi Oshunrinde	WondaGurl	4:12
3.	"Huey Knew THEN" (featuring Dash)	Stevens; Darien Corey Dash, Jr.; William Thomas Trenell Brown	Willie B	4:30
4.	"Threatening Nature"	Stevens	Pakk Music Group	3:24
5.	"Womanogamy"	Stevens; Michael Len Williams II; Matthew Day	Mike Will Made It; DJ Fu	3:56
6.	"INvocation" (featuring Kokane)	Stevens; Jerry Buddy Long Jr.; Columbus Smith III	Rahki	5:07
7.	"Wifey Vs. WiFi" / / / "P.M.S." (featuring BR3)	Stevens; Derrick Hutchins, Jr.	Skhye Hutch	4:21
8.	"Beat the Case" / / / "Straight Crooked" (featuring Schoolboy Q)	Stevens; Quincy Matthew Hanley; Hutchins, Jr.; Donte Perkins	Skhye Hutch; TaeBeast	5:21
9.	"Portishead in the Morning" / / / "HER World"	Stevens; Tyran Donaldson	Pakk Music Group; Antydote	4:27
10.	"God's a Girl?"	Stevens	Pakk Music Group	3:14
11.	"Now You Know"	Stevens	ASAP P on the Boards	4:03
12.	"D.R.U.G.S."	Stevens; Francis Nguyen-Tran	FrancisGotHeat	5:56
13.	"Evil Genius" (featuring Teedra Moses and JaVonté)	Stevens; Teedra Shenita Moses; Fredrik Halldin; Nguyen-Tran	FrancisGotHeat; Tommy Black	5:48
14.	"Lonely Soul" / / / "The Law (Prelude)" (featuring Punch and SZA)	Stevens; Solána Imani Rowe; Mark Anthony Spears; Stephen Lee Bruner	Sounwave	6:34
15.	"The Law" (featuring Mac Miller and Rapsody)	Stevens; Malcolm James McCormick; Marlanna Evans	Bentley Haze	5:29
16.	"YMF"	Stevens	Bentley Haze	5:50
Total length:				76:57

Notes

- "Womanogamy" features additional vocals from Schoolboy Q
- "Threatening Nature" features additional vocals from Dash
- "D.R.U.G.S." features additional vocals from Mac Miller
- "Lonely Soul" / / / "The Law (Prelude)" features additional bass by Thundercat
- "Portishead in the Morning" / / / "HER World" features additional ad-libbing from Isaiah Rashad

Sample credits

- "Evil Genius" contains a sample of "Let You Shine", as performed by Alori Joh.

== Charts ==
Chart performance for Do What Thou Wilt.
Chart (2016)	Peak position
New Zealand Heatseeker Albums (RMNZ)	8
US Billboard 200	34
US Top R&B/Hip-Hop Albums (Billboard)	9
