= Hood Gone Love It =

Single by Jay Rock featuring Kendrick Lamar

from the album Follow Me Home
- Released: June 21, 2011
- Recorded: 2011
- Genre: West Coast hip-hop
- Length: 4:07
- Label: TDE; Strange
- Songwriter(s): Johnny McKinzie; Kendrick Duckworth; Erik Ortiz; Kevin Crowe
- Producer(s): J.U.S.T.I.C.E. League

Jay Rock singles chronology
"All My Life (In the Ghetto)" (2008)	"Hood Gone Love It" (2011)	"Pay for It" (2014)

Kendrick Lamar singles chronology
"HiiiPoWeR" (2011)	"Hood Gone Love It" (2011)	"The Recipe" (2012)

"Hood Gone Love It" is a song by American hip-hop recording artist Jay Rock. It was released as the second single from his debut studio album Follow Me Home (2011). The song features Rock's Black Hippy cohort Kendrick Lamar and was produced by American production team J.U.S.T.I.C.E. League. It was also used in promotion for and included in the game Grand Theft Auto V. The song peaked on the US Billboard Bubbling Under R&B/Hip-Hop Singles at number 18.

== Background ==
After having performed the song for months while on tour, the full CDQ version of the song featuring Kendrick Lamar's verse was premiered on June 21, 2011. The song's production was handled by hip hop production team J.U.S.T.I.C.E. League.

In the song, Jay Rock sketches a picture of hood life, while Lamar raps circles around the slow soul instrumental. Lamar also shouts out "Thug Life," a nod to his Tupac Shakur fandom, while he raps in knotty double time. The song samples "Easy Days" by the Pointer Sisters.

The song was included in a trailer for Grand Theft Auto V, profiling the character of Franklin Clinton. It was then additionally included on the Radio Los Santos station on the in-game radio.

== Critical reception ==
"Hood Gone Love It" was met with generally positive reviews from music critics. Jeff Weiss of Los Angeles Times said, "Compton and Watts rappers rhyming about their roots and their version of old-time religion. But great rap is usually some variation of that theme. They make their own stories synonymous with their hood, and along the way, more than just the hood will love it. Andres Vasquez of HipHopDX called the song an "anthemic banger that any hood could appreciate."

Nathan S. of DJBooth.net said, "If Follow Me Home has a manifesto it’s "Hood Gone Love It", a declaration of Rock’s loyalties to the block that raised him. With Kendrick throwing down on a guest verse, "Hood Gone Love It" is the sound of the next standing on the shoulders of those who came before with Jay at his more lyrically complex, revealing a deeply personal undercurrent that runs throughout his music." Ayo of Soul Culture also praised the song saying, "To say the least both Jay and the emcee formally known as K.Dot lyrically black out on J.U.S.T.I.C.E. League's near breath taking instrumental, but it's Lamar who predictably steals the show with his verse." Adam Fleischer of XXL praised Kendrick Lamar's appearance on the song.

== Music video ==
Three days after single's release, on June 24, 2011, the music video featuring Kendrick Lamar was premiered on MTV2's Sucka Free Countdown. The video was filmed in Nickerson Gardens, the rest of Watts, and Compton, California, and paid homage to Dr. Dre and Snoop Dogg's video for "Nuthin' but a 'G' Thang".

== Remix ==
On July 16, 2011, just prior to the release of Follow Me Home, Jay Rock released the remix to "Hood Gone Love It" featuring rappers Rick Ross and Birdman.

== Charts ==
Chart (2011)	Peak position
US Bubbling Under R&B/Hip-Hop Singles (Billboard)	18
