= Whatchu Bringing? =

Studio album by Dinner Party
- Released: August 7, 2026
- Studio: Sunset Sound Recording Studio (Los Angeles)
- Genres: R&B; jazz
- Length: 25:07
- Labels: Sounds of Crenshaw; EMPIRE
- Producers: 9th Wonder; Channel Tres; Phoelix; Terrace Martin

Dinner Party chronology
Enigmatic Society (2023)	Whatchu Bringing? (2026)

Professional ratings
Review scores
Source	Rating
AllMusic	4/5 stars
Pitchfork	7.3/10

Whatchu Bringing? is the third studio album by the American jazz and hip-hop supergroup Dinner Party, consisting of Terrace Martin, Robert Glasper, Kamasi Washington, and 9th Wonder. The album was released on August 7, 2026, through Empire and Sounds of Crenshaw. The record follows the group's 2023 album Enigmatic Society and features vocalist Phoelix on seven of its nine tracks, along with a spoken-word introduction from poet J. Ivy. The lead single "If It Ain’t Broke (Love Wins)" was released on July 10th.

== Background ==
Dinner Party was formed in 2020 as a collaboration between four established personalities in contemporary jazz, R&B, and hip-hop. The group's debut self-titled EP earned a Grammy nomination for Best Progressive R&B Album, while their 2023 full-length Enigmatic Society continued their blend of jazz improvisation with hip-hop production. The album's title and opening track play on the metaphor of a potluck gathering, with J. Ivy's spoken-word introduction chiding a late guest before softening into an affirmation that "love is what you bringing".

The album is notably brief, clocking in at approximately 25 minutes across nine tracks, with most songs running under three minutes. This concision has been characterized by the group as an intentional choice to accommodate shortened attention spans, with Glasper describing the approach as meeting listeners where they are.

== Reception ==
Matthew Ismael Ruiz of Pitchfork stated: "On Dinner Party’s 2020 self-titled debut EP, they dabbled in pop song structures and carved out more room for the members’ individual voices. Whatchu Bringing? feels less energetic, but smoother—more relaxed and subsequently more confident. Glasper has admitted that the brevity of Dinner Party records is an attempt to meet their potential audience’s truncated attention spans. To that end Whatchu Bringing? feels akin to musical tapas, with small bites stretched out into what are effectively long interludes, each bite satisfying if not entirely filling."

Andy Kellman of AllMusic wrote: "...the players serve up another comforting soul-cuterie board of concise compositions that favors intricate rhythmic interplay over flash and disregards boundaries between jazz, funk, soul, and hip-hop. There's little in the way of ostentation, and that's fine, as these concise grooves are stimulating enough, inviting the kind of repeat play that reveals new details with each listen."

== Track listing ==
No.	Title	Writer(s)	Length
1.	"Stop Being Late"	Patrick Douthit, Robert Glasper, James Ivy Richardson II, Terrace Martin, Michael Neil, Kamasi Washington	2:43
2.	"If It Ain't Broke (Love Wins)"	Patrick Douthit, Robert Glasper, Terrace Martin, Michael Neil,Kamasi Washington	2:25
3.	"Stargazing"	Patrick Douthit, Robert Glasper, Terrace Martin, Michael Neil, Kamasi Washington	3:40
4.	"Breakfast at Sharkey's"	Patrick Douthit, Robert Glasper, Terrace Martin, Michael Neil, Isaiah Sharkey, Kamasi Washington	2:30
5.	"I Wonder"	Robert Glasper, Terrace Martin, Michael Neil, Kamasi Washington	2:17
6.	"Just My Type"	Robert Glasper, Terrace Martin, Michael Neil	3:00
7.	"I'm Yours"	Robert Glasper, Terrace Martin, Michael Neil	2:18
8.	"Mutual Respect"	Robert Glasper, Terrace Martin, Michael Neil, Sheldon Young	2:44
9.	"Peace of Mind"	Patrick Douthit, Robert Glasper, Terrace Martin, Michael Neil, Kamasi Washington	3:30
Total length:			25:07

== Personnel ==
Dinner Party

- Terrace Martin – production, arrangements, multi-instrumentalist
- Robert Glasper – piano, keyboards
- Kamasi Washington – saxophone
- 9th Wonder – production, beats

Additional

- Phoelix – vocals (tracks 2–8), co-writing (all tracks)
- J. Ivy – spoken word (track 1)
- Isaiah Sharkey – guitar (multiple tracks)
