= Nick Grant =

American rapper (born c.1989)

- Born: c. 1989 (age 36–37); Walterboro, South Carolina, US
- Origin: Atlanta, Georgia, US
- Genres: Hip hop
- Occupations: Rapper; songwriter
- Instrument: Vocals
- Label: Grand Hustle
- Member of: A Room Full of Mirrors

Nick Grant (born c. 1989) is an American rapper. He is currently signed to Grand Hustle Records. Aside from his solo musical career, Grant is a member of hip hop collective A Room Full of Mirrors, alongside fellow rappers Punch, Daylyt, The Ichiban Don, Lyric Michelle, Hari, and more.

== Biography ==
Grant was born c. 1989, in Walterboro, South Carolina, later moving to Atlanta. As a child, he listened to Jay-Z, A Tribe Called Quest and Tupac Shakur, among others. He began rapping at age 12.

Grant signed to Grand Hustle Records in 2014, and released his debut mixtape '88 in 2016. He later received cosigns from André 3000 and Nas.

On September 23, 2023, Grant released SUNDAY DINNER, produced by TaeBeast and Amarah Session. He later went on tour for his album, featuring Ab-Soul, Chronixx and Lauryn Hill, among others.

In June 2024, Grant and Hit-Boy were featured on Link Up TV.

On April 17, 2026, Grant released the single "Same Song", featuring Punch (president of Top Dawg Entertainment).

== Discography ==
- Smile (2026)
- I Took It Personal (2025)
- SUNDAY DINNER (2023)
- Welcome to Loveland (2022)
- Dreamin' Out Loud (2018)
- Return of the Cool (2017)
- A Seat at the Table Plus One (2016)
- '88 (2016)
