= Willie B (producer) =

American rapper (born 1983)

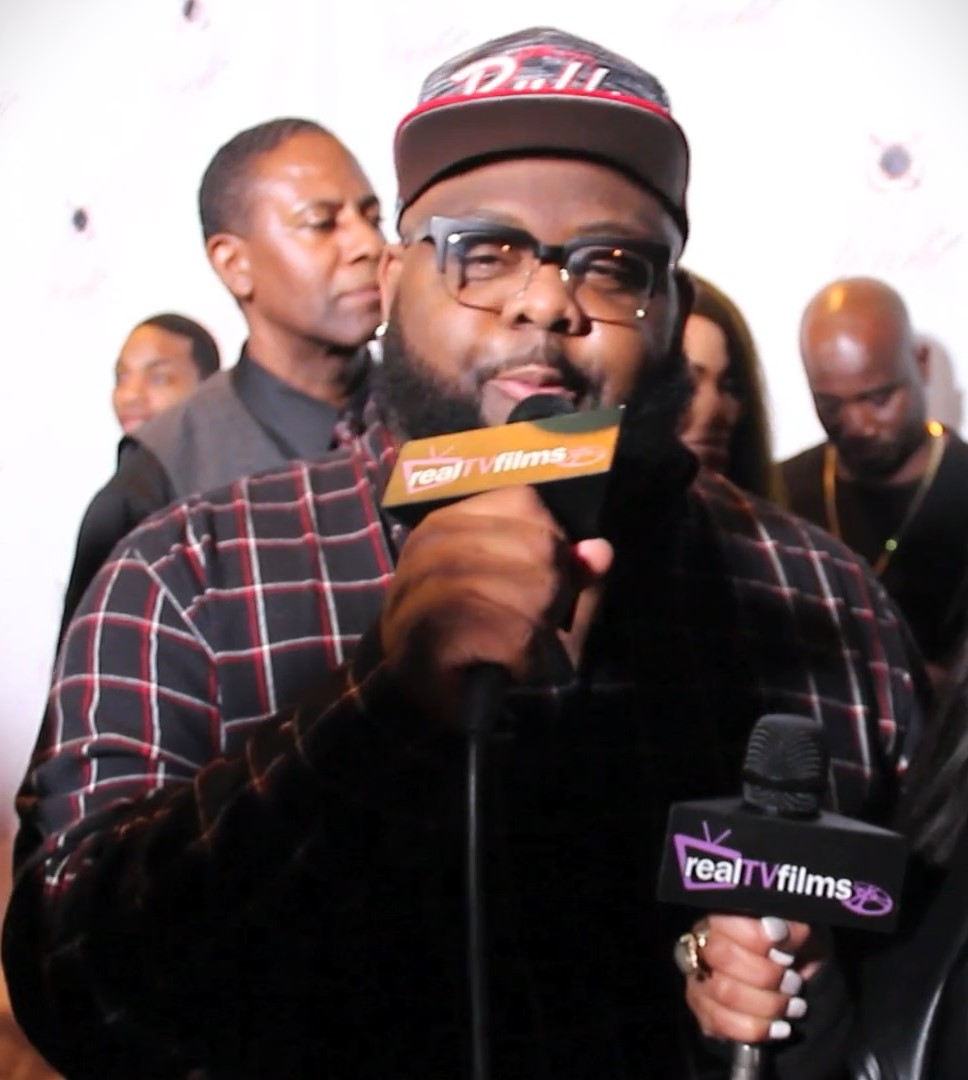
- Willie B in 2016

Background information
- Also known as: The Ichiban Don
- Born: William Thomas Trenell Brown; July 5, 1983 (age 43); Los Angeles, California, U.S.
- Genres: Hip hop; West Coast hip hop
- Occupations: Record producer; rapper
- Instruments: Vocals; FL Studio; Pro Tools
- Years active: 2005–present
- Label: Top Dawg
- Member of: Digi+Phonics; A Room Full of Mirrors

William Thomas Trenell Brown (born July 5, 1983), known professionally as Willie B or by the stage name the Ichiban Don, is an American hip hop record producer and recording artist from Los Angeles, California. He is an original member of West Coast hip hop production team Digi+Phonics of Top Dawg Entertainment. He is also a member of the hip hop collective A Room Full of Mirrors, alongside fellow rappers Punch, Nick Grant and Daylyt, among others.

== Musical career ==
On January 6, 2011, Willie B released a mixtape titled I'm Not a Producer hosted by DJ Age and featuring guest appearances from Jay Rock, Talib Kweli, Busta Rhymes, Little Brother, Crooked I, Kendrick Lamar, Bishop Lamont, Glasses Malone, and Kurupt. He is best known for producing Kendrick Lamar's "Ignorance Is Bliss" and "Rigamortis" from Lamar's Overly Dedicated and Section.80, respectively. He has also produced Ab-Soul's "Black Lip Bastard", and Schoolboy Q's "Gangsta in Designer (No Concept)", from his second studio album Habits & Contradictions, among other songs for TDE. Outside of TDE he has produced for artists such as Freddie Gibbs, Childish Gambino, Wale and Apollo the Great, among others. On July 27, 2013, he released the first ever Instagram-only instrumental mixtape.

== Discography ==
=== Studio albums ===
- Let There B Lyt (with Daylyt) (2017)
- Heroes (with Daylyt) (2021)

=== Mixtapes ===
- I'm Not a Producer (2011)

=== Guest appearances ===
List of guest appearances, with other performing artists, showing year released and album name
Title	Year	Artist(s)	Album
"B.O.B. (Barack Over Bad Guys)"	2009	Bishop Lamont, Indef, Affion Crockett	Team America Fuck Yeah: Special Forces
"Holla!" (Remix)	2010	Kida, Busta Rhymes, Little Brother, Kurupt, Crooked I, Talib Kweli, Jay Rock	The Endemic
"My Wife"	2010	Curtiss King	Jet Pack On E
"Is It"	2012	Moe-D, K.D.	Out of Nowhere

== Production discography ==
=== 2009 ===
Bishop Lamont & Indef - Team America Fuck Yeah: Special Forces

- 13. "B.O.B. (Barack Over Bad Guys)" (featuring Affion Crockett and Willie B)

=== 2010 ===
Ab-Soul - Longterm 2: Lifestyles of the Broke & Almost Famous

- 07. "Soul Cry"
- 11. "Mayday"

Kendrick Lamar - Overly Dedicated

- 06. "Opposites Attract (Tomorrow W/O Her)" (featuring JaVonté)
- 08. "Ignorance Is Bliss"

Jay Rock - Black Friday

- 01. "No Joke" (featuring Ab-Soul)

=== 2011 ===
ScHoolboy Q - Setbacks

- 02. "Kamikaze"

Kendrick Lamar - Section.80

- 08. "Poe Man's Dream (His Voice)" (featuring GLC)
- 12. "Rigamortus" (produced with Sounwave)

Jay Rock - Follow Me Home

- 04. "No Joke" (featuring Ab-Soul)
- 09. "All I Know Is"
- 10. "I'm Thuggin'"
- 11. "Kill or Be Killed" (featuring Tech N9ne and Krizz Kaliko)

=== 2012 ===
ScHoolboy Q - Habits & Contradictions

- 11. "Gangsta in Designer (No Concept)"

Ab-Soul - Control System

- 12. "Showin' Love"
- 17. "Black Lip Bastard (Remix)" (featuring Black Hippy)

Wale - Folarin

- 14. "Fa We We Freestyle"

=== 2013 ===
Freddie Gibbs - Evil Seeds Grow Naturally

- 06. "Lay It Down"

Raven Sorvino - Queen of HeArts

- 07. "In My Mind" (featuring A$ton Matthews, Mike G and Maxo Kream)

Eric Bellinger - Your Favorite Christmas Songs

- 07. "Chestnuts Roasting"

=== 2014 ===
ScHoolboy Q - Oxymoron

- 07. "Prescription / Oxymoron" (produced with Sounwave)

J. Cole - 2014 Forest Hills Drive

- 04. "03' Adolescence"

=== 2015 ===
Mickey Taelor - HiiGrade Vol. 2

- 07. "Gemini 2.0 (featuring DJ Rhettmatic)
- 09. "Love In Time (produced with DAE ONE)
- 10. "Wassup" (Willie B Remix)

=== 2016 ===
J. Cole - Forest Hills Drive: Live

- 04. "03' Adolescence (Live)"

Mickey Taelor - Essentials

- 01. "Essentials (Intro)"
- 02. "XYZ (Julie’s Song)"
- 03. "This Iz 4 U" (produced with Don Parker)
- 04. "3stacks"
- 05. "Work It Out" (produced with J. Anthny)
- 06. "Trainwreck"
- 07. "Gemini 3.0" (featuring J. Anthny)
- 09. "Complicated" (featuring Boogie)
- 10. "Love Architects/Roll Up" (feat. Stoney Tha Dealer)

ScHoolboy Q - Blank Face LP

- 14. "Black Thoughts"

J. Anthny - Two Sides EP

- 02. "Where's Your Money" (produced with J. Anthny)
- 03. "My NY Bitch"
- 04. "Two Sides" (featuring Elle Pierre)
- 05. "Down" (produced with J. Anthny)
- 06. "What You Want" (featuring Jessica Jolia)
- 07. "Risky (Interlude)"
- 10. "100 Miles" (featuring Mickey Taelor and Chevy Jones) [produced with J. Anthny]

Ab-Soul - Do What Thou Wilt.

- 03. "Huey Knew THEN" (featuring Da$H)

J.I.D - "BRUUUH - Single"

- 1. "BRUUUH"

=== 2017 ===
Daylyt & Willie B - "Let There B Lyt"

- 01. "Let There B Lyt"
- 02. "Finnessegawd" [produced with DJ Swish]
- 03. "First Breath"
- 04. "King of Thuh Dot" (featuring J.Anthny)
- 05. "Ratchets"
- 06. "Girl Shit" (featuring Mickey Taelor)
- 07. "Day Electronica" (featuring Chevy Jones)
- 08. "Queen"
- 09. "Last Breath"

J. Cole

- 00. "Want You to Fly"
