= Marlon Williams (American musician) =

GUITARIST

- Born
- Origin: Los Angeles, California, United States
- Genres: Hip hop; jazz-fusion; pop
- Occupations: Musician; record producer
- Instruments: Guitar; bass guitar
- Years active: 1980s–present
- Labels: Priority; Top Dawg Entertainment; Ropeadope

Marlon Williams is a hip-hop guitarist and producer from Los Angeles. He is best known for his work as musical director for Snoop Dogg. He helped launch the careers of Terrace Martin and Kamasi Washington by inviting them to tour and record with Snoop. He has also recorded with Nate Dogg, Warren G, Kendrick Lamar and The Pollyseeds, and was an early member of Fishbone.

== Discography ==
As guitarist

- Mýa – Fear of Flying (2000)
- Warren G – The Return of the Regulator (2001)
- Snoop Dogg – Paid tha Cost to Be da Boss (2002)
- Warren G – In the Mid-Nite Hour (2005)
- Snoop Dogg – Bigg Snoop Dogg Presents... Welcome to tha Chuuch: Da Album (2005)
- Snoop Dogg – Tha Blue Carpet Treatment (2006)
- Snoop Dogg – Ego Trippin' (2008)
- Snoop Dogg – Malice n Wonderland (2009)
- Kurupt – Streetlights (2010)
- Kendrick Lamar – Good Kid, M.A.A.D City (2012)
- Snoop Dogg – Reincarnated (2013)
- Terrace Martin – 3ChordFold (2013) (also producer)
- YG – My Krazy Life (2014)
- Kendrick Lamar – To Pimp a Butterfly (2015)
- YG – Still Brazy (2016)
- Schoolboy Q – Blank Face LP (2016)
- The Pollyseeds – Sounds of Crenshaw Vol. 1 (2017) (also co-producer)
- Adam Turchin – Manifest Destiny (2017)
- Fergie – Double Dutchess (2017)
- YG – Stay Dangerous (2018)
