= 3ChordFold =

Studio album by Terrace Martin
- Released: August 13, 2013
- Recorded: 2012–2013; Manhattan Sound Recordings; New York City, New York; COE.BE.III Soundscave; Atlanta, Georgia; Somerset Sounds; Westlake Recording Studios; Henson Recording Studios; Los Angeles, California; Paramount Studios; Hollywood, California
- Genre: Hip-hop
- Length: 70:59
- Label: AKAI Music; Empire
- Producer: Terrence "Punch" Henderson (exec.); 9th Wonder; Craig Brockman; Focus...; Robert Glasper; Terrace Martin; Quincy Jones

Singles from 3ChordFold
- 1. "Something Else" Released: February 12, 2013

3ChordFold is the debut studio album by American producer Terrace Martin. The album was released on August 13, 2013, by AKAI Music and Empire Distribution. The album features guest appearances from Ab-Soul, Kendrick Lamar, Problem, Musiq Soulchild, Robert Glasper, James Fauntleroy, Focus..., Wiz Khalifa, Brevi, Ty Dolla Sign, Snoop Dogg, Lalah Hathaway, Tiffany Gouché, and Punch, who also executive produced the album.

== Singles ==
On February 12, 2013, the album's first single "Something Else" featuring Problem was released. On May 7, 2013, the music video was released for "Something Else" featuring Problem. On August 2, 2013, the music video was released for "No Wrong No Right" featuring Robert Glasper and James Fauntleroy. On October 1, 2013, the music video was released for "You're The One" featuring Ty Dolla Sign.

== Critical response ==
Professional ratings
Review scores
Source	Rating
HipHopDX	4/5 stars
RapReviews	8.5/10
XXL	(XL)

3ChordFold received generally positive reviews from music critics. Jay Balfour of HipHopDX gave the album four out of five stars, saying "Overall, 3ChordFold is a gratifying listen, in part, and this is beholden to Jazz albums of the past, because it’s full of memorable moments. Taken as a whole, it acts as a smooth mix of R&B and hip-hop (despite the previous term’s continually being encompassed by the second), and its best characteristic is its creator’s musicality. Even when building a song that might fit on the radio, Martin’s production has a dynamism too often missing in today’s hip-hop. In the end, it’s hard to complain too much about a lack of truly deep lyricism when there is so much else to pick through. In 2011, Martin told MTV, “The good thing about music is you can just keep on doing it.” Free of the lifestyle agenda and celebrity of his peers, Martin may be a logical pick for continued musicianship in hip-hop. As fans, we can only hope he just keeps on doing it." Christian Mordi of XXL gave the album an XL, saying "With strong melodies, experimental textures and an array of stellar guest spots, 3chordfold is an often excellent album. Martin continues to showcase his ability to merge a mixture of jazz and funk backdrops with his California rhymes throughout the record. While early mixtapes like Locke High and Locke High 2 introduced the underground to Terrace Martin, 3ChordFold should open the door to many mainstream fans to a talented musician." Zach Gase of RapReviews gave the album an 8.5 out of ten, saying "Terrace Martin is many things: a rapper, a producer, a saxophone player, among other things. On his debut full-length album, "3ChordFold" he expertly utilizes all of his skills to create one of the year's best records."

== Track listing ==
Unless otherwise indicated, Credits are adapted from liner notes

No.	Title	Writer(s)	Producer(s)	Length
1.	"Ab Soul's Intro" (featuring Ab-Soul)	Terrace Martin; Herbert Stevens	Terrace Martin	3:52
2.	"Triangle Ship" (featuring Kendrick Lamar)	Martin; Camille Davis; Kendrick Lamar Duckworth	9th Wonder; Martin	5:40
3.	"Get Away"	Martin; Davis	Martin	3:44
4.	"Something Else" (featuring Problem)	Martin; Davis; Jason Martin	9th Wonder; Martin	4:29
5.	"Over Time" (featuring Musiq Soulchild)	Martin; Davis; Taalib Johnson; Terrence Henderson; Craig Brockman	Martin	3:36
6.	"No Wrong No Right" (featuring Robert Glasper & James Fauntleroy)	Martin; Davis; James Fauntleroy	Martin	5:06
7.	"Watch U Sleep" (featuring Focus...)	Martin; Bernard Edwards Jr.	Focus...	5:43
8.	"Move On"	Martin; Davis; Javonte Pollard	9th Wonder; Martin	4:41
9.	"Motivation" (featuring Wiz Khalifa & Brevi)	Martin; Kory Garnett; Cameron Thomaz	Martin	3:40
10.	"Happy Home (Freeloader, Renter, Buyer)"	Martin; Davis; Pollard	Martin	5:14
11.	"Angel"	Martin; Brockman	9th Wonder; Brockman	3:45
12.	"You're the One" (featuring Ty Dolla $ign)	Martin; LaTonya Givens; Tyrone Griffin	Martin	5:27
13.	"I'm For Real" (featuring Snoop Dogg & Lalah Hathaway)	Martin; Abraham Moses	Martin	3:31
14.	"Gone" (featuring Robert Glasper, Tiffany Gouché & Punch)	Martin; Davis; Glasper	Martin; Glasper	12:05
15.	"Can't Help It" (hidden track)	Stevie Wonder; Susaye Greene	Quincy Jones
Total length:				70:59

Notes

- All Interludes are written by Wyann Vaughn
- "Can't Help It" is originally performed by Michael Jackson as "I Can't Help It"

== Sample credits ==
Triangle Ship

- "Shhh" by Tevin Campbell
- "What You Won't Do for Love" by Bobby Caldwell

Something Else

- "How Deep Is Your Love" by Keith Sweat

Over Time

- "Ironside" by Quincy Jones
- "The Light" by Common

Move On

- "Let's Chill" by Guy

Angel

- "They Don't Know" by Jon B.

I'm For Real

- "I'm for Real" by Howard Hewett

== Personnel ==
Credits adapted from liner notes

- Terrace Martin: vocoder (15), bass (15, additional on 4), Fender Rhodes (8), mini moog (8), keyboard bass (6), additional keyboards (2, 4), percussion (1), saxophone (2–3, 6, 14), horn arrangements (7), instruments (all other on 10, additional on 11), mixing
- Craig Brockman: additional keyboards (2, 6, 14), Fender Rhodes (5, 11, 13), mini-moog (11), piano (1), Roland Jupiter-8 (9), additional music arrangements (5, 9)
- Neka "LB" Brown: additional vocals (1, 3, 8, 15)
- Kenneth Crouch: keyboards (15), all instruments (Interludes)
- James Fauntleroy: additional vocals (6)
- Focus...: additional vocals (7), all other instruments (7)
- Robert Glasper: piano (14), Fender Rhodes (6)
- Andrew Gouche: bass (8, 13)
- Tiffany Gouché: additional vocals (14)
- Terrence "Punch" Henderson: additional vocals (14), executive producer
- Trevor Lawrence: drums (15)
- Josef Leimberg: trumpet (1)
- Javonte Pollard: additional vocals (1, 8, 10)
- Problem: additional vocals (4), additional music arrangements (3–4)
- Tone Trezure: additional vocals (12)
- Wyann Vaughn: vocals (Interludes, additional on 6)
- Derrick "D-Loc" Walker: percussion (15)
- Marlon Williams: guitar (1, 3, 5–6, 8–10, 12–13, 15), music arrangements (15, additional on 5, 9, 13), executive producer
- Cabraeb Martinez: mastering
- Jose Cervantes: photography
- Black Ostrich Marketing & Design: art direction, design

== Charts ==
Chart (2013)	Peak position
US Top R&B/Hip-Hop Albums (Billboard)	43
US Heatseekers Albums (Billboard)	9
