= The Invitation Tour =

2010 concert tour by 50 Cent

- American tour by 50 Cent
- Promotional poster for the tour
- Associated albums: Before I Self Destruct and his fifth studio album
- Start date: May 28, 2010
- End date: June 25, 2010
- No. of shows: 23

The Invitation Tour was a tour by rapper 50 Cent in support of his latest/upcoming studio albums, Before I Self Destruct, Black Magic (which was subsequently shelved), and his fifth studio album. The tour also featured G-Unit artists Tony Yayo, Lloyd Banks, 40 Glocc, Spider Loc, Trav, and Governor. Other artists featured on the tour include Jay Electronica, Jay Rock, and Lil B, and professional boxer Floyd Mayweather along with Brazilian football star Ronaldinho. Appearances by several additional artists have occurred, including Ludacris and E-40.

== Background ==
50 Cent stated that G-Unit will not tour with him due to Lloyd Banks the rising success of his first single from his new album and Tony Yayo completing his next album. 50 has said that he will be performing songs from his fourth studio album, Before I Self Destruct, and his uptempo fifth studio album, Black Magic. 50 announced that he would be recruiting new artists to sign to his label, who would also tour with him. He has confirmed that R&B artist, Governor would be featured in the tour. Recently, New Orleans artist, Jay Electronica, confirmed that he too would be featured in the tour. Ludacris has joined on to perform at Chene Park in Detroit on May 29, 2010.

== Locations ==
The tour's itinerary included the following 17 cities. Originally 19 cities were announced, but the shows in Cleveland on May 28, Dallas on June 11, Atlanta on June 17, Raleigh on June 19, and New York on June 22 were all canceled. However, 3 shows (Ventura, St. Petersburg, and Lewiston) were added, with late addition Lewiston having a notably smaller population than the rest of the tour locations.

Date	City	Country	Venue
North America
May 29, 2010	Detroit	United States	Chene Park
May 30, 2010	Chicago	United States	UIC Pavilion
June 1, 2010	Denver	United States	Filmore
June 3, 2010	San Francisco	United States	The Warfield
June 4, 2010	Los Angeles	United States	Nokia Theatre L.A. Live
June 5, 2010	Ventura	United States	Majestic Ventura Theater
June 6, 2010	Las Vegas	United States	The Pearl
June 7, 2010	Phoenix	United States	Celebrity Theater
June 10, 2010	Kansas City	United States	Midland Theatre
June 12, 2010	Houston	United States	Arena Theater
June 15, 2010	Miami	United States	Filmore
June 16, 2010	St. Petersburg	United States	Jannus Live
June 18, 2010	Myrtle Beach	United States	House of Blues
June 20, 2010	Lewiston	United States	Lewiston Urban Civic Center
June 23, 2010	Wallingford	United States	Oakdale Theatre
June 24, 2010	Boston	United States	House of Blues
June 25, 2010	Atlantic City	United States	House of Blues
South America
July 9, 2010	Salvador	Brazil	Wet n’ Wild
July 10, 2010	Goiânia	Brazil	Fasam University
July 15, 2010	São Paulo	Brazil	Via Funchal
July 16, 2010	Belo Horizonte	Brazil	Mineirinho
July 17, 2010	Rio de Janeiro	Brazil	Marina da Glória
July 18, 2010	Florianópolis	Brazil	Passarela Nego Querido
