= Daylyt =

American rapper (born 1985)

- Born: 1985 (age 40–41)
- Origin: Watts, Los Angeles, California, US
- Genres: West Coast hip-hop
- Occupations: Rapper; songwriter
- Years active: 2009–present

Davone Campbell (born 1985), better known by his stage name Daylyt, is an American rapper. He is best known for his battle rapping and his guest appearance and production on J. Cole's 2024 song "Pi", which peaked at number 62 on the Billboard Hot 100. Prior, he was known for his work as a battle rapper and eccentric online videos and behavior. Daylyt is a member of hip hop collective A Room Full of Mirrors, alongside Punch, Nick Grant, the Ichiban Don, Lyric Michelle, Hari, and more.

== Biography ==
Campbell was born in 1985 and grew up near the Jordan Downs housing project in Watts, Los Angeles. He attended Jordan High School. After graduating in 2003, he joined Krak City; other members included Dizaster and Compton-based AV LMKR. Campbell joined Grind Time in 2009 as a battle rapper.

Campbell soon became a fixture on the Los Angeles battle rap scene. He gained attention for his use of props and stunts during his battles. In 2018, he appeared in Jhené Aiko's music video for "Never Call Me". In 2024, he released two songs with J. Cole, "A Plate of Collard Greens" and "Pi" from J. Cole's mixtape Might Delete Later. In 2025, Campbell became involved in a rap beef with New York-based rapper Joey Badass.

Campbell lives in Irvine, California with his partner Mari. He has two children, a son and a daughter. He has a large tattoo of Spawn on his face.

== Discography ==
- The Black and White Project (2016)
- Let There B Lyt (2017)
- 72hrs in ATL (2018)
- Kingqueen (2018)
- The End of My 2018 (2018)
- Jesus is King (2019)
- Heroes (2019)
- LYT II SOCIETY... (2019)
- Heroes7peace (2024)
