= Terrace Martin =

American musician (born 1978)

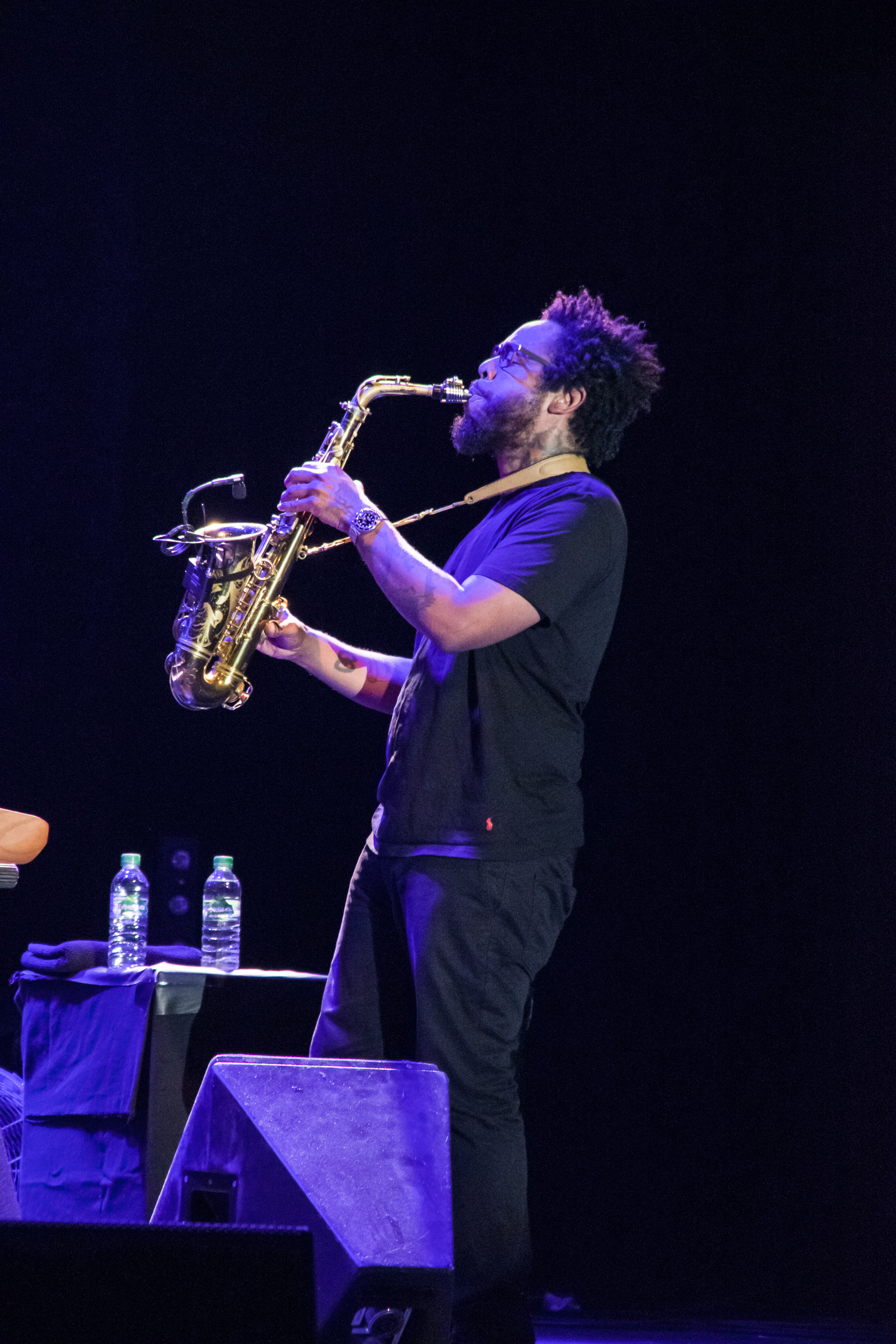
- Martin performing in 2017

Background information
- Born: Terrace Jamahl Martin; December 28, 1978 (age 47); Los Angeles, California, U.S.
- Genres: Hip hop; jazz; jazz-fusion; pop
- Occupations: Musician; rapper; singer; record producer; songwriter
- Instruments: Vocals; saxophone; keyboards; drums; guitar
- Years active: 2004–present
- Labels: Sounds of Crenshaw; Ropeadope; AKAI Music (current); Warner Bros.; BMG Rights Management; EMPIRE (former)
- Member of: West Coast Get Down; Dinner Party

Terrace Jamahl Martin (born December 28, 1978) is an American musician, rapper, singer, and record producer. He is perhaps best known for producing records for several prominent artists in the music industry, including Kendrick Lamar, Snoop Dogg, the Game, Busta Rhymes, Stevie Wonder, Charlie Wilson, Raphael Saadiq and YG, among others. Martin is a multi-instrumentalist whose music production embodies funk, jazz, classical and soul. Martin released his sixth studio album, Velvet Portraits, on his label, Sounds of Crenshaw Records, through Ropeadope Records.

== Early life ==
Martin's father, Ernest "Curly" Martin, was a jazz drummer and Omaha Black Music Hall of Fame member, and his mother is a singer. He grew up listening to a broad range of music, including John Coltrane and Parliament and began playing the piano at age six. At 13, producing his first tracks on his Casio CZ-101 Keyboard and an E-mu SP-1200, Martin was encouraged to take up the saxophone and learned to play it by himself before enrolling into Santa Monica High School, to sharpen his musical skills. He transferred to Locke High School, to study under Reggie Andrews, where he became first chair of the All-State Jazz Band. As a child prodigy, Martin gained the interest of talk show host Jay Leno, who presented him with a scholarship and later purchased his first professional horn. After high school, Martin attended CalArts but decided school wasn't for him, and began touring with Puff Daddy and the gospel choir God's Property.

Martin is cousins with Ronald Bruner, Jr. and his brother Stephen "Thundercat" Bruner, with whom he has collaborated since childhood. Alongside the Bruner brothers, he was a founding member of the West Coast Get Down jazz collective, who began playing together in high school.

== Musical career ==
Martin was recognized by Hollywood and music industry elites and found favor in the jazz world, where he played as a member of Billy Higgins' World Stage All-Stars. Martin's big break came when he produced a Power 106 radio drop with Snoop Dogg. He scored a minor hit with 213's "Joysticc" and went on to become one of Snoop Dogg's sought after producers, placing credits on R&G (Rhythm & Gangsta): The Masterpiece and Ego Trippin albums. In 2007, he signed a record deal with Warner Bros. Records by A&R executives Kenny "Tick" Salcido and Craig Aaronson.

The Demo, Martin's 2010 debut album, features him as a rapper and producer. The album includes beats and guest verses from artists including Snoop Dogg, Wiz Khalifa, Pete Rock, DJ Quik and Kurupt. On September 28, 2010, Terrace Martin and radio personality Devi Dev released the extended play (EP) Here, My Dear. The first single from the EP is "Roll Up Another One", featuring Wiz Khalifa and Overdoz. The EP features guest appearances from Snoop Dogg, Charlie Wilson, Kurupt, Kendrick Lamar, U-n-i, James Fauntleroy II and pianist Kenneth Croutch. The EP is inspired by Marvin Gaye's 1978 album of the same name. On December 21, 2010, Terrace Martin and Devi Dev launched their online music series #DeviTerraceTuesday. On February 22, 2011, they released their second project together, The SEX EP.

=== 3ChordFold ===
In 2013, Martin released 3ChordFold, a fusion studio album project. 3ChordFold was followed up with 3ChordFold: Remixed in December 2013, and 3ChordFold: Pulse in Spring 2014, which featured many live performances with guest appearances from Robert Glasper and Thundercat, among others. In 2015, Martin was heavily involved in the development of Kendrick Lamar's critically acclaimed album, To Pimp a Butterfly. On April 1, 2016, Martin released his long-awaited, sixth studio album, Velvet Portraits on his Sound of Crenshaw label through Ropeadope. His latest release features appearances from his To Pimp A Butterfly cohorts, Kamasi Washington, Lalah Hathaway, Robert Glasper and Thundercat. Recorded in Los Angeles and Omaha, Nebraska, the highly anticipated Velvet Portraits also taps into his roots, featuring his father Curly Martin on drums and legendary soul group, The Emotions. Velvet Portraits was nominated in the "Best R&B Album" category of the 59th Grammy Awards.

In addition to releasing personal projects, Martin is currently producing albums for Herbie Hancock, YG, SZA and Fergie.

On June 25, 2020, Terrace Martin, Kamasi Washington, Robert Glasper, and 9th Wonder announced the formation of a supergroup, Dinner Party. They released a single, "Freeze Tag". Their debut album was released on July 10, 2020.

== Influences ==
Martin's role models include Miles Davis, Charlie Parker, Jackie McLean, John Coltrane, Herbie Hancock, Sonny Stitt, Grover Washington, Jr., Dr. Dre, DJ Quik, Battlecat, DJ Premier, Pete Rock, and 1580 K-Day. Martin has said, "I started producing hip-hop tracks because it was the music of my time, but I never lost my love for jazz."

== Discography ==
=== Studio albums ===
- Melrose (with Murs) (Mursworld.com, 2011)
- The 4 Luv Suite (Empire, 2012)
- 3ChordFold (AKAI Music, 2013)
- 3ChordFold: Pulse (Empire, 2014)
- Times (Empire, 2014)
- Velvet Portraits (Ropeadope, 2016)
- Sounds of Crenshaw Vol. 1 (with The Pollyseeds) (Ropeadope, 2017)
- Dinner Party (with Robert Glasper, Kamasi Washington and 9th Wonder as Dinner Party) (Sounds of Crenshaw, 2020)
- Drones (Sounds of Crenshaw, 2021)
- Enigmatic Society (with Robert Glasper, Kamasi Washington and 9th Wonder as Dinner Party) (Sounds of Crenshaw, 2023)
- Fine Tune (Sounds of Crenshaw, 2023)
- Curly (Sounds of Crenshaw, 2023)
- I Left My Heart in Ladera (with Alex Isley) (Sounds of Crenshaw, 2023)
- Come As You Are (with Kenyon Dixon) (Sounds of Crenshaw, 2025)
- PERSPECTIVE (Sounds of Crenshaw/EMPIRE, 2026)
- Whatchu Bringing? (with Robert Glasper, Kamasi Washington and 9th Wonder as Dinner Party) (Sounds of Crenshaw, 2026)

=== Remix albums ===
- 3ChordFold: Remixed (AKAI Music, 2013)
- Dinner Party: Dessert (with Robert Glasper, Kamasi Washington and 9th Wonder as Dinner Party) (Sounds of Crenshaw, 2020)

=== EPs ===
- 808s & Sax Breaks (2010)
- The Sex EP (2011)
- The Sex EP 2.0: Cease & Desist (2011)
- Northside of Linden, Westside of Slauson (with Salaam Remi) (2019)
- Sinthesize (2020)
- Soul Juice (2020)
- Conscious Conversations (2020)
- They Call Me Disco (with Ric Wilson) (2020)
- Impedance (2020)
- Village Days (2020)
- NOVA (with James Fauntleroy) (2023)
- Her Thoughts (2024)

=== Mixtapes ===
- Signal Flow (2007)
- Locke High (2008)
- Here, My Dear (2010)
- Hard Drives: Instrumentals Vol 1 (2011)
- Locke High 2 (2011)
- Thoughts From Detention (2011)

=== Singles ===
- "Pig Feet" (2020) (with Denzel Curry, Daylyt, G Perico and Kamasi Washington)

== Grammy Awards ==
The Grammy Awards are awarded annually by the National Academy of Recording Arts and Sciences. Martin has earned 8 nominations.

Year	Award	Nominated work	Result
2014	Album of the Year	good kid, m.A.A.d city	Nominated
2016	Album of the Year	To Pimp a Butterfly	Nominated
2017	Best R&B Album	Velvet Portraits	Nominated
2022	Best Progressive R&B Album	Dinner Party (with Kamasi Washington, Robert Glasper, and 9th Wonder)	Nominated
2023	Best Progressive R&B Album	Drones	Nominated
2024	Best Progressive R&B Album	NOVA (with James Fauntleroy)	Nominated
2026	Best Progressive R&B Album	Come As You Are (with Kenyon Dixon)	Nominated
2026	Best Melodic Rap Performance	"WeMaj" (with Kenyon Dixon and Rapsody)	Nominated
