= Control System =

Studio album by Ab-Soul
- Released: May 11, 2012
- Recorded: TDE Recording Studio: House of Pain (Carson, California)
- Genre: Hip hop; jazz rap
- Length: 71:44
- Label: TDE
- Producer: Anthony "Top Dawg" Tiffith (exec.); Punch (co-exec.); Dave Free (also co-exec.); AAhyasis; Curtiss King; King Blue; Nez & Rio; Skhye Hutch; Sounwave; Tae Beast; Tommy Black; Willie B.

Ab-Soul chronology
Longterm Mentality (2011)	Control System (2012)	These Days… (2014)

Singles from Control System
- 1. "Terrorist Threats" Released: 2012; 2. "Pineal Gland" Released: 2012; 3. "SOPA" Released: 2012

Control System is the second studio album by American rapper Ab-Soul. It was released on May 11, 2012, by Top Dawg Entertainment (TDE). The album features guest appearances from Jhené Aiko, Danny Brown, Schoolboy Q, Jay Rock, BJ the Chicago Kid, Kendrick Lamar, JaVonte, Punch, Ashtrobot and vocals from the late Alori Joh. The album's production was handled by Digi+Phonics, King Blue, Nez & Rio, Skhye Hutch, Curtiss King, Aahyasis, and Tommy Black.

== Background ==
The album is Ab-Soul's second full-length project, which was preceded by numerous promotional singles, the first being "Black Lip Bastard" on January 17, 2012. The song was produced by Willie B. On February 28, 2012, Ab-Soul, along with Schoolboy Q, appeared on Sway Calloway's #SwayInTheMorning radio show, where Ab-Soul called "Black Lip Bastard": "pretty much one of the title tracks", the song, however, failed to make the album's final track listing. The first song that appears on the album, to be released was "Showin' Love", also produced by Willie B. On April 6, 2012, Ab-Soul released the track, titled "Terrorist Threats". The song features frequent collaborator Jhené Aiko and Danny Brown, who proclaimed on Twitter that "Black Hippy the new Beatles and I'm Harry Nilsson".

On April 17, 2012, Ab-Soul revealed the album's title to be Control System and unveiled the release date to be May 11, 2012. That same day he also released a music video for "Pineal Gland". On April 24, 2012, another single, by the title of "SOPA" was released. The song, produced by Nez & Rio, references Stop Online Piracy Act (SOPA), a United States bill introduced by US Representative Lamar S. Smith, that would've allowed the US government controversial control over the internet.

On May 1, 2012, Ab-Soul released another music video for a song titled "Empathy"; the song features vocals from JaVonte and his late friend and girlfriend Alori Joh, who committed suicide in February 2012. On May 4, 2012, it was revealed "Black Lip Bastard" was remixed and will feature his Black Hippy cohorts, Jay Rock, Kendrick Lamar and Schoolboy Q. On May 8, 2012, his collaboration with Kendrick Lamar, titled "Illuminate" was released. The music video would be released on January 15, 2013. The day before the album's release Ab-Soul revealed the track listing and released snippets from the album. The album cover, designed by Ab-Soul and Hassana Lynne, draws inspiration from the Tree of Life and features a heartfelt dedication on the back to Alori: "Dedicated to the beautiful soul of Loriana Angel Johnson, aka Alori Joh."

== Recording and production ==
Throughout 2011 and 2012, Ab-Soul was working on his second album. He had recorded the songs "Empathy" and "A Rebellion" with Alori Joh. On February 7, 2012, it was reported a young woman committed suicide by leaping from a radio tower; the woman was later identified as Loriana Johnson, also known as Alori Joh. In a June 2012 interview with HipHopDX, Ab-Soul publicly spoke on Joh's death and how it impacted him and the album: "I was actually pretty much done with the project before that happened. Luckily for me and all of us cause I definitely don't think I would have been able to put it out in the time that I did. It was difficult. It's still very difficult. She helps me out with all of my projects. It's a very difficult thing to get over but at the same time this is what we've been – we, me and her, were working on for the majority of the time I've known her. She was one of my biggest supporters so I feel like I owe her and I owe everybody else that's taken a liking to what we're doing." "The Book of Soul" was of the last tracks that he recorded on the project, he touches on a couple topics throughout his life, with Alori Joh being the main subject over a jazzy instrumental produced by Tommy Black.

== Critical reception ==
Professional ratings
Aggregate scores
Source	Rating
Metacritic	83/100
Review scores
Source	Rating
AllMusic	4/5 stars
DJBooth.net	4/5 stars
Exclaim!	8/10
HipHopDX	4.5/5 stars
MSN Music (Expert Witness)	A−
Pitchfork	8.1/10
Spin	8/10
XXL	4/5

Upon its release, Control System received universal acclaim from music critics. At Metacritic, which assigns a weighted mean rating out of 100 to reviews from mainstream critics, the album received an average score of 83, based on 10 reviews, which indicates "universal acclaim". The album was named the 20th best of 2012 by Complex Magazine. Spin Magazine named the album the twelfth best hip hop album of 2012. Robert Christgau ranked the album 46th on his 2012 "Dean's List".

== Track listing ==
No.	Title	Writer(s)	Producer(s)	Length
1.	"Soulo Ho3" (featuring Jhené Aiko)	Herbert Anthony Stevens IV; Jhené Aiko Efuru Chilombo; Mark Anthony Spears; David Isaac Friley	Sounwave; Dave Free	3:57
2.	"Track Two"	Stevens; Donte Perkins; Jeff Lynne	TaeBeast	4:03
3.	"Bohemian Grove"	Stevens; Perkins; Friley; Aretha Louise Franklin	TaeBeast; Dave Free	4:23
4.	"Terrorist Threats" (featuring Jhené Aiko and Danny Brown)	Stevens; Chilombo; Daniel Dewan Sewell; Friley; Darren Korb; Shawn Corey Carter; Jonathan Burks; Timothy Zachery Mosley	Dave Free	4:24
5.	"Pineal Gland"	Stevens; Perkins; Bo Hansson	TaeBeast	3:52
6.	"Double Standards" (featuring Anna Wise)	Stevens; Anna Wise; Spears; Peter John Sinfield; Robert Fripp	Sounwave	4:21
7.	"Mixed Emotions"	Stevens	King Blue	4:08
8.	"SOPA" (featuring ScHoolboy Q)	Stevens; Quincy Matthew Hanley; Nesbitt Wesonga Jr.; Mario Loving	Nez & Rio	4:09
9.	"Lust Demons" (featuring Jay Rock and BJ the Chicago Kid)	Stevens; Johnny Reed McKinzie, Jr.; Bryan James Sledge; Perkins; Isaac Lee Hayes Jr.	TaeBeast	3:41
10.	"ILLuminate" (featuring Kendrick Lamar)	Stevens; Kendrick Lamar Duckworth; Derrick Hutchins, Jr.; Spears; Madonna Louise Ciccone; Patrick Ray Leonard	Skhye Hutch	5:07
11.	"A Rebellion" (featuring Alori Joh)	Stevens; Loriana Johnson; Dwan Howard; Paul Frederic Simon; William James Adams Jr.; Jaime Luis Gomez; Allan Pineda Lindo; Paul Poli; Greg Phillinganes; B. Gibb; T. Smith	Curtiss King	3:48
12.	"Showin' Love"	Stevens; William Thomas Trenell Brown; Frederick Russell Jones	Willie B	4:57
13.	"Empathy" (featuring Alori Joh and JaVonté)	Stevens; Johnson; Hutchins	Skhye Hutch	3:01
14.	"Nothing's Something"	Stevens; Kanye West; Richard Charles Rodgers; Lorenz Milton Hart	AAhyasis	2:30
15.	"Beautiful Death" (featuring Punch and Ashtrobot)	Stevens; Ash Winston Riser; Hutchins; Rico Wade; Ray Murray; Patrick Leroy Brown; Joi Elaine Gilliam; Myrna Crenshaw Brown	Skhye Hutch	4:30
16.	"The Book of Soul"	Stevens; Fredrik Halldin; Jones; George Ivan Morrison	Tommy Black	5:11
17.	"Black Lip Bastard (Remix)" (performed by Black Hippy) (Bonus track)	Stevens IV; Hanley; Duckworth; McKinzie; Brown; Leon Russell	Willie B	5:49
Total length:				71:44

Sample credits

- "Track Two" contains a sample of "Tightrope", as performed by Electric Light Orchestra.
- "Bohemian Grove" contains a sample of "Day Dreaming" by Aretha Franklin and "Elegant People" by Weather Report.
- "Terrorist Threats" contains a sample of "The Bottom Feeders" as composed by Darren Korb (from the Bastion soundtrack) and interpolates "Nigga What, Nigga Who (Originator 99)", written by Shawn Carter, Jonathan Burks and Timothy Mosley.
- "Pineal Gland" contains a sample of "Attic Thoughts", as performed by Bo Hansson.
- "Double Standards" contains material sampled from "Islands", as performed by King Crimson.
- "Lust Demons" contains a sample of "Aruba", as performed by Isaac Hayes.
- "Illuminate" contains a sample from "Live to Tell" by Madonna, and an interpolation of "A.D.H.D.", written by Kendrick Lamar, Ab-Soul and Mark Spears.
- "A Rebellion" contains a sample of "Follow the Path", as performed by Midnight Star, "50 Ways to Leave Your Lover" as performed by Paul Simon, and contains an interpolation of "Joints & Jam", written by Black Eyed Peas featuring Kim Hill & Ingrid Dupree.
- "Showin' Love" contains a sample of "Swahililand", as performed by Ahmad Jamal.
- "Nothing's Something" contains an interpolation of "Addiction", written by Kanye West, Richard Rodgers and Lorenz Hart.
- "Beautiful Death" contains a sample of "You May Die (Intro)", as performed by OutKast.
- "The Book of Soul" contains a sample of "Swahililand", as performed by Ahmad Jamal and "Moondance", as performed by Bobby McFerrin.
- "Black Lip Bastard (Remix)" contains a sample of "A Song for You", as performed by Donny Hathaway.

== Charts ==
Chart (2012)	Peak position
US Billboard 200	91
US Top R&B/Hip-Hop Albums (Billboard)	12
US Top Rap Albums (Billboard)	9
US Top Independent Albums (Billboard)	13
