= Setbacks (album) =

Studio album by ScHoolboy Q
- Released: January 11, 2011
- Recorded: 2010; TDE Recording Studio: House of Pain (Carson, California)
- Genre: Hip-hop; West Coast hip-hop; experimental hip-hop
- Length: 62:36
- Label: TDE
- Producer: Lord Quest; Willie B; Focus...; Phonix Beats; Dae One; Tae Beast; DJ Wes; King Blue; Rahki; Tommy Black; Sounwave

ScHoolboy Q chronology
Gangsta & Soul (2009)	Setbacks (2011)	Habits & Contradictions (2012)

Setbacks is the debut studio album by American hip hop recording artist ScHoolboy Q, released for digital download on January 11, 2011, under Top Dawg Entertainment (TDE). The album features guest appearances from fellow Black Hippy members Kendrick Lamar, Jay Rock and Ab-Soul, as well as vocals from singer-songwriters Alori Joh, Jhené Aiko and BJ the Chicago Kid. The album's production was handled by Lord Quest, Willie B, Focus..., Rahki, Phonix Beats, Tae Beast, DJ Wes, King Blue, Sounwave and more.

Schoolboy Q titled the album Setbacks due to the limitations he experienced and endured before releasing the album. After the release of Setbacks, the album reached number 100 on the US Billboard 200, number 12 on the Top Rap Albums, number 25 on the Top R&B/Hip-Hop Albums and number 13 on the Top Independent Albums chart. Only a few weeks after Setbacks was released, it already had 4,395 units and was praised by fans and critics alike.

== Background ==
In 2012, in an interview with Complex, Schoolboy Q spoke on the concept behind Setbacks: "The concept behind Setbacks was [to talk about] all the shit that’s the reason why I can’t rap. The reason I can’t accomplish what I want to accomplish is because I’m doing all this dumb shit. I put it all together on the album. Like, ‘Druggys Wit Hoes,’ I'm out here drugging and I'm not even trying to fuck with hoes. ‘Kamikaze,’ I'm not even trying to rap—keep going broke. Different shit like that, I sum it up all in one album. My life did a whole 180 after that dropped. A lot of people still didn't know the name though, but a lot of people did. It was weird. It just took me to the right spot. I made some fucking money off the project, it helped me see that I needed to do more positive shit in life, and it made me into the person I am now. All I do now is just chill. I'd rather just chill, work on my music, be with my two-year-old daughter, and smoke weed and shit." Two weeks after the album's release ScHoolboy Q released it for free via his Twitter feed. The free version doesn't include "LigHt Years AHead" and is replaced with "Live Again" which also features Kendrick Lamar. The free version also features a new bonus track titled "Fuck Ya Hip Hop" featuring Big Pooh and Murs

== Reception ==
=== Commercial performance ===
The album debuted at number 100 on the US Billboard 200 chart and had sold 17,000 copies in the US as of February 2014.

=== Critical response ===
Setbacks received generally positive reviews from music critics, who praised the album's production, features and lyrics. iHipHop gave it a 3.5 out of 5 rating mentioning "While Setbacks is a misleading title, ScHoolboy Q does leave room for critique. Despite his overwhelmingly impressive flow, Q rarely says anything worthy of raising an eyebrow." Allmusic gave it 4 out of 5 stars commenting "Dividing his time between socially conscious rap and bud smoker’s anthems, ScHoolboy Q makes quite the impression on his debut “street album"". They called Setbacks polished, funky, well-balanced, and rewarding.

== Track listing ==
No.	Title	Producer	Length
1.	"Figg Get da Money"	LordQuest	3:59
2.	"Kamikaze"	Willie B	4:03
3.	"LigHt Years Ahead (Sky High)" (featuring Kendrick Lamar)	Focus...	4:11
4.	"WHat's tHa Word" (featuring Jay Rock)	Phonix Beats	3:51
5.	"#BETIGOTSUMWEED"	Tae Beast	4:55
6.	"Druggys Wit Hoes" (featuring Ab-Soul)	Tae Beast	3:50
7.	"Cycle"	DJ Wes	4:09
8.	"To THa Beat (F'd Up)"	King Blue of Sore Losers	3:47
9.	"Crazy"	Sounwave	3:06
10.	"PHenomenon" (featuring Alori Joh)	Phonix Beats	5:01
11.	"Situations"	Rahki	4:24
12.	"Fantasy" (featuring Jhené Aiko)	Tommy Black	4:27
13.	"I'm Good" (featuring BJ the Chicago Kid & Punch)	Tae Beast	4:57
14.	"Birds & the Beez" (featuring Kendrick Lamar)	Dae One	4:20
15.	"Rolling Stone" (performed by Black Hippy; bonus track)	Sounwave	3:36
Total length:			62:36

== Charts ==
Chart (2011)	Peak position
US Billboard 200	100
US Billboard Top R&B/Hip-Hop Albums	25
US Billboard Top Rap Albums	12
US Billboard Top Independent Albums	13
