= Dave Free =

American filmmaker (born 1986)

- Born: David Isaac Friley; November 13, 1986 (age 39); Inglewood, California, U.S.
- Occupations: Filmmaker; record producer; record executive; DJ
- Years active: 2004–present
- Organization: pgLang
- Known for: Manager of Kendrick Lamar
- Musical career
- Also known as: Miyatola; Dee.Jay.Dave
- Genres: West Coast hip hop; alternative R&B
- Label: Top Dawg (former)
- Member of: The Little Homies
- Formerly of: Digi+Phonics

David Isaac Friley (born November 13, 1986), known professionally as Dave Free, is an American filmmaker and record producer. Born and raised in Inglewood, California, he is best known as the manager and creative partner of fellow California native Kendrick Lamar. During his tenure as co-president of Top Dawg Entertainment (TDE), Free directed music videos and short films with Lamar under the name the Little Homies. Following his departure from TDE in 2019, he co-founded the creative company pgLang with Lamar. Free's accolades include two Grammy Awards and three MTV Video Music Awards.

== Early life ==
David Isaac Friley was born on November 13, 1986, in Inglewood, California; the son of a couple from the North and South Sides of Chicago. He is the youngest of three children. Friley is a childhood friend of rapper Kendrick Lamar, having met while they were both in high school. After graduating, he worked as a computer technician while helping Lamar begin his rap career. He used his job to showcase Lamar's music to Anthony "Top Dawg" Tiffith, founder and CEO of independent record label Top Dawg Entertainment (TDE), which led to him signing a recording contract with the label in 2005.

== Career ==
Shortly after Lamar signed with TDE, Free joined the label as an in-house producer. He became a member of the hip hop production team Digi+Phonics alongside Sounwave, Willie B and Tae Beast and worked significantly on projects for the hip hop supergroup Black Hippy, composed of Lamar, Jay Rock, Schoolboy Q and Ab-Soul. Their production work received critical praise; Complex named Digi+Phonics as one of the top 25 new producers to watch out for in November 2012. BET named them as one of the top ten young producers on the rise in July 2013.

Free's business career began as the social media director for TDE. In 2007, he was named the label's co-president alongside Terrence "Punch" Henderson. Free subsequently became Lamar's manager during his tenure and co-directed several of his studio albums and accompanying music videos under the collective name The Little Homies. Their filmmaking work earned praise and led to the duo winning the Grammy Award for Best Music Video and the MTV Video Music Awards for Best Hip Hop Video and Video of the Year.

On October 4, 2019, Rolling Stone reported that Free had left TDE and was working independently. He was also helping rapper Baby Keem as he started gaining recognition and expressed his intention of "getting heavy into the film game." On March 5, 2020, Free and Lamar launched the "multi-lingual" creative company PGLang. Through the company, Free has written and directed several music videos and advertising campaigns for Calvin Klein, Converse and Cash App. On January 13, 2022, Free and Lamar announced they were producing an untitled comedy film with South Park creators Trey Parker and Matt Stone for Paramount Pictures.

On 31 July 2025, PGLang announced Project 3, their newest branch and creative agency. The announcement was released along with a short film titled The Agency, starring Chase Sui Wonders and Lionel Boyce, directed by Jack Begert, who co-wrote it alongside Free.

== Accolades ==
| Organization | Year (Note: Indicates the year of ceremony. Each year is linked to the article about the awards held that year, wherever possible.) | Category | Nominated work | Result | Ref. |
|---|---|---|---|---|---|
| BET Awards | 2023 | Video Director of the Year | Free and Kendrick Lamar | Nominated | |
| BET Hip Hop Awards | 2022 | Video Director of the Year | Free and Kendrick Lamar | Won | |
| BET Hip Hop Awards | 2023 | Video Director of the Year | Free and Kendrick Lamar | Won | |
| Cannes Lions International Festival of Creativity | 2023 | Film Craft Lion for Direction | We Cry Together – A Short Film | Grand Prix | |
| Grammy Awards | 2016 | Best Music Video | "Alright" | Nominated | |
| Grammy Awards | 2018 | Best Music Video | "Humble" | Won | |
| Grammy Awards | 2023 | Best Music Video | "The Heart Part 5" | Nominated | |
| Grammy Awards | 2024 | Best Music Video | "Count Me Out" | Nominated | |
| Grammy Awards | 2024 | Best Music Film | Live From Paris, The Big Steppers Tour | Nominated | |
| Grammy Awards | 2025 | Best Music Video | "Not Like Us" | Won | |
| MTV Video Music Awards | 2015 | Best Direction | "Alright" | Won | |
| MTV Video Music Awards | 2015 | Video of the Year | "Alright" | Nominated | |
| MTV Video Music Awards | 2017 | Best Direction | "Humble" | Won | |
| MTV Video Music Awards | 2017 | Video of the Year | "Humble" | Won | |
| MTV Video Music Awards | 2022 | Best Direction | "Family Ties" | Nominated | |
| MTV Video Music Awards | 2023 | Best Direction | "Count Me Out" | Nominated | |
| Variety Hitmakers | 2022 | Creativity and Impact Award | Himself | Won | |

== Discography ==
Credits adapted from AllMusic.

As producer

- Ab-Soul – Longterm Mentality (2011), Control System (co-exec.) (2012), These Days... (2014)
- Isaiah Rashad – The Sun's Tirade (2016)
- Jay Rock – 90059 (assoc.) (2015), Redemption (assoc.) (2018)
- Kendrick Lamar – Kendrick Lamar (exec.) (2009), Overly Dedicated (exec.) (2010), Section.80 (2011), Good Kid, M.A.A.D City (assoc.) (2012), Black Panther: The Album (assoc.) (2018)
- Lance Skiiiwalker – Introverted Intuition (2016)
- Schoolboy Q – Setbacks (exec.) (2011), Habits & Contradictions (also co-exec.) (2012), Oxymoron (assoc.) (2014), Blank Face LP (assoc.) (2016)
- SZA – Ctrl (assoc.) (2017)

As creative director

- Kendrick Lamar – Damn (2017), Black Panther: The Album (artwork direction) (2018), Mr. Morale & the Big Steppers (2022)
- Schoolboy Q – Oxymoron (art direction) (2014), Blank Face LP (2016)
