= HiiiPoWeR =

2011 single by Kendrick Lamar

Single by Kendrick Lamar

from the album Section.80
- Released: April 12, 2011
- Recorded: 2010
- Genre: Conscious hip-hop; hardcore hip-hop
- Length: 4:41
- Label: Top Dawg Entertainment
- Songwriters: Kendrick Lamar; Jermaine Cole
- Producer: J. Cole

Kendrick Lamar singles chronology
| "HiiiPoWeR" (2011) | "Hood Gone Love It" (2011) |

"HiiiPoWeR" (also stylised as "HiiiPower") is the official debut single by American rapper Kendrick Lamar which released on April 12, 2011. The conscious hip-hop song also serves as the lead single from his independently released debut album, Section.80 (2011). The song was written by Lamar and features production from rapper J. Cole and backing vocals from the late singer Alori Joh.

While the album itself garnered positive reviews (achieving a Metacritic score of 80 and an XL rating from XXL), "HiiiPoWeR" also drew significant acclaim for its lyricism and depth. HipHopDX gave it the Verse of the Year award and XXL called it "one of the finest tracks of the year".

== Conception ==
The song's production was handled by American rapper J. Cole. The song contains samples and interpolations from Pharoahe Monch's "Simon Says" and Kanye West's "So Appalled", respectively. Kendrick Lamar had mentioned that when he and J. Cole were creating "HiiiPoWeR" (which marks their first collaboration), he sat in for about 25 mixes of the song. When speaking on J. Cole's work on the song, Lamar said, "His production is crazy, man. The first time we locked in, he played about 10 beats. I wanted 11 of 'em." The song includes vocals from American singer-songwriter Alori Joh, who at the time had been working extensively with members of the Top Dawg Entertainment roster.

== Movement ==
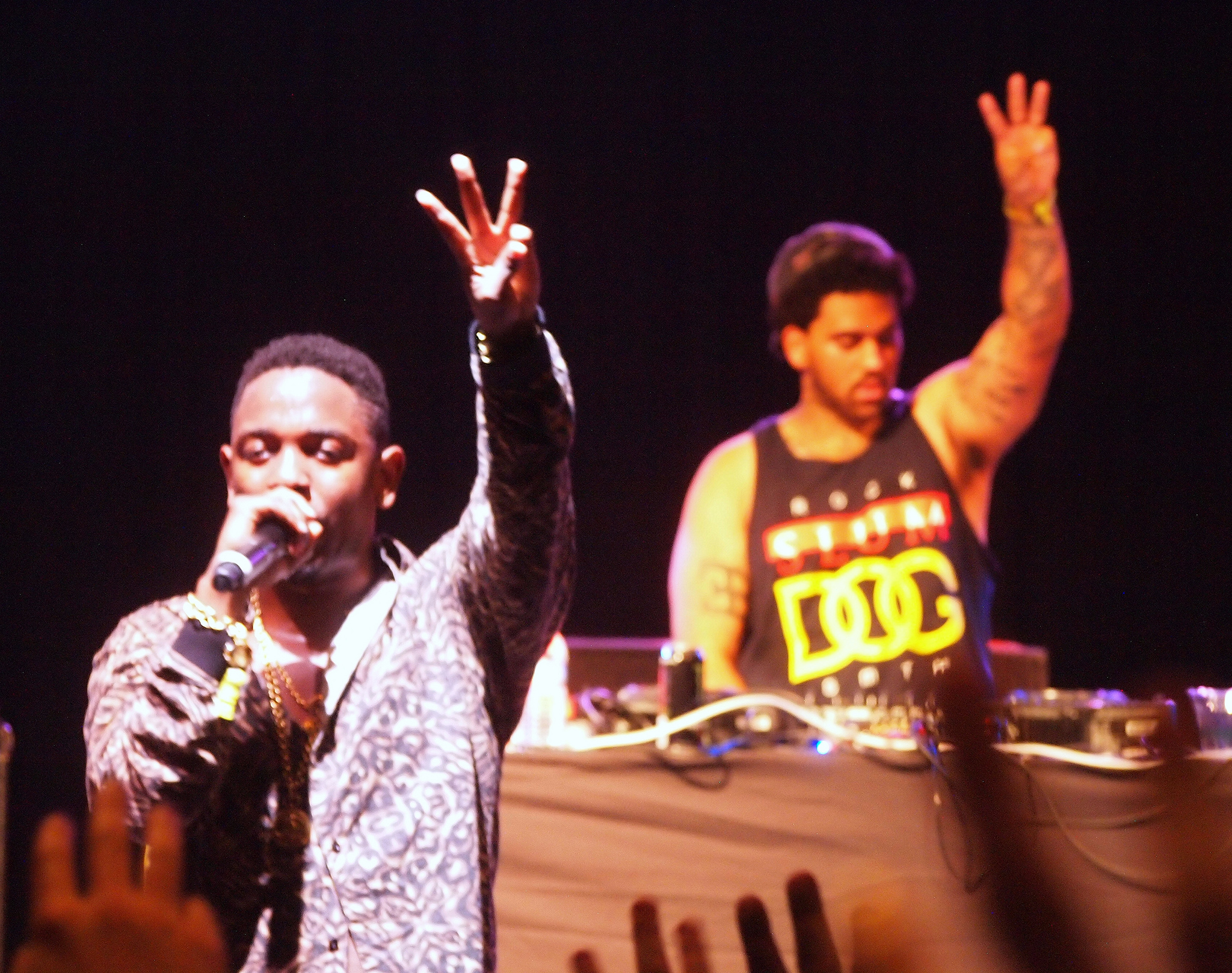
Lamar performing at the Bonnaroo Music Festival, 2012.

Kendrick Lamar and his Black Hippy cohort Ab-Soul, describe "HiiiPoWeR" as a movement, adding that they treat it as if it were a religion. In an interview, Lamar claims that although it originated in Los Angeles, "HiiiPoWeR" is now "spreading like wildfire." It is a response to the ever-increasing destructive nature of the culture in the US, both the mainstream culture and more importantly the hip-hop culture, which some would say is wallowing at an all-time low since its birth in the 1970s. Lamar continues, to explain that the three 'i's in the word "HiiiPoWeR" stand for heart, honor and respect—the three main things that people should have and live by. In "Ab-Souls Outro", the penultimate track on Section.80, Ab-Soul explains that the purpose of the HiiiPoWeR movement is to help lift a generation in a society that they view as destructive.

Lamar often connects the HiiiPoWeR movement back to Tupac Shakur, one of his biggest influences. He claims to have had a dream or hallucination in which Shakur came to him one night and said, "Keep doing what you're doing, don't let my music die." Lamar cites this experience as what inspired him to write the song partly to continue the messages that Shakur tried to carry. The opening of the music video for "HiiiPoWeR" contains a typed paragraph mentioning this encounter. Additionally, towards the end of the song Kendrick Lamar shouts "Thug Life", which is both the name of the hip hop group that Shakur led, and the title of the aforementioned group's debut album, but more importantly it was Shakur's own respective movement. Jay Rock, Schoolboy Q, and Ab-Soul (the other three members of Black Hippy Crew) all support the movement as well, and often shout "HiiiPoWeR" on their own respective songs, such as on Schoolboy Q's "There He Go" and Ab-Soul's "Black Lip Bastard Remix".

== Content ==
The song was created to further explain the HiiiPoWeR platform or the ideas driving it. While carrying a strong racial theme, the lyrics contain a mix of conspiracy theories about the government's involvement in famous murders, criticism of society, and encouragement to build the future.

Kendrick Lamar makes multiple references to high-profile black activists of the 20th century, including Martin Luther King Jr., Malcolm X, Marcus Garvey, and Fred Hampton. He claims that many of these activists, specifically noting Black Panther Party's leaders Huey Newton and Bobby Seale, lived by the ideals of HiiiPoWeR. His lyrics also connect to the militancy of the Black Panthers by referencing cop-killing ("I got my finger on the mothafuckin' pistol/ Aiming it at a pig, Charlotte's web is gonna miss you"). Using Kurt Cobain's suicide and Lauryn Hill's recent troubles as examples, he repeatedly states in the lyrics of the song that society pushes people to act in crazy or evil ways.

Ab-Soul has stated in interviews that he highly influenced the song. He explains that although he didn't write the lyrics or encourage Lamar to write "HiiiPoWeR", the content resulted from "years and years of me talking that shit that nobody wanna to hear, to him".

== Music video ==
The music video for "HiiiPoWeR", is composed of a series of short clips and images and is heavily themed around riots. It includes clips of Lamar rapping to the song, news clips of riots and rebellions all over the world, and images of notable figures from history and the media. The opening seconds of the music video contain a glimpse of Malcolm X holding up three fingers as he speaks. Holding up three fingers is often used as a symbol for the song and HiiiPower movement (when performing the song live, Lamar sometimes has the audience put three fingers in the air). An image in the second half of the music video shows a crowd of people holding up three fingers in the air. Also notable in the video is the common use of images of police brutality. At the two uses of the word "racist" in the song, the video first shows an image of Sean Hannity and then an image of Bill O'Reilly. The video ends with Kendrick Lamar dousing himself in gasoline, and is cut off as he drops a match on himself. The music video also includes an alleged picture of late hip hop legend Tupac Shakur's autopsy picture, and a picture of the car he was last seen in after he got shot.

== Recordings referencing "HiiiPoWeR" ==
From Overly Dedicated (2010)

On the Overly Dedicated album cut titled "Cut You Off (to Grow Closer)", Lamar delves more deeply into his philosophical views, and how the behavior of those around him affects him. He mentions Napoleon Hill (author of Think and Grow Rich) and decried the tearing-down of others that he observes keeping his acquaintances stuck in a negative mind state. At the end of the track, there is a short soliloquy:

HiiiPower is the way we think. The way we live. See it's known today that the human race is nothing. No morals, no standards. What we're about to do is raise the level of expectations. No, you don't have to have a lot of money. You don't have to be rich. But you will be rich in mind and spirit. Some say it's big as a crew, some say its big as a gang. We stand for it as if it's a religion.

Quite poignantly, this statement is followed by a song entitled "Heaven & Hell", which is more of a poetic picture than a traditional rap song. It describes two views of black life, and further develops the overall aesthetic of the HiiiPower mission. The track briefly features singer Alori Joh and (uncredited) Ab-Soul shouting in the background.

From Good Kid, M.A.A.D City (2012)

On the track "Bitch, Don't Kill My Vibe" it is mentioned just briefly in the lyric "Threes in the air, I can see you are in sync".

== Release history ==
| Country | Date | Format | Label |
|---|---|---|---|
| United States | April 12, 2011 | Digital download; streaming | Top Dawg Entertainment |
