= Longterm Mentality =

Studio album by Ab-Soul
- Released: April 5, 2011
- Recorded: 2010–11
- Studio: House of Pain, Carson, California
- Genre: Hip hop
- Length: 58:18
- Label: Top Dawg Entertainment
- Producer: Tae Beast; Ayiro; Sounwave; AAyhasis; Context; Alexis Carrington; Tommy Black

Ab-Soul chronology
Longterm 2: Lifestyles of the Broke and Almost Famous (2010)	Longterm Mentality (2011)	Control System (2012)

Longterm Mentality is the first full-length studio album by American hip hop artist Ab-Soul. It was released on April 5, 2011, by Top Dawg Entertainment (TDE), exclusively to digital retailers, serving as Ab-Soul's debut retail release. The album features guest appearances from Jhené Aiko, Schoolboy Q, Kendrick Lamar, Punch, Alori Joh, JaVonté, MURS, BJ the Chicago Kid and Pat Brown, with the production from Tae Beast, Ayiro, Sounwave, AAyhasis, Context, Alexis Carrington and Tommy Black. Upon its release, the album was highly acclaimed by music critics.

== Background ==
Preceded by the mixtapes such as Longterm: The Mixtape (2009) and Longterm 2: Lifestyles of the Broke and Almost Famous (2010), Ab-Soul stated Longterm Mentality is not the third installment in his Longterm series. In July 2010, in an interview with Complex, Stevens claimed the series would have four installments, "When I did the first Longterm I knew that there would be four of them. When I did the first one. So there will be four of them: Longterm 1, 2, 3, and 4. So right now we're at two. You'll have to wait for the next one. That's for the next Ab-Soul interview." In August 2011, in an interview with BlowHipHopTV, Ab-Soul explained in spite of the fact that Longterm Mentality is not a part of the series, all three projects paint a picture of his personal life and growth. While speaking with BlowHipHopTV, the Black Hippy member said that the project is intended to introduce listeners to the man behind the mic:

I wanted to do something to where all of my supporters and people that’s following me could actually witness the entire growth of the whole situation. So Longterm was just an introduction. Longterm 2 was more personal about where I was at with it in my life at that particular time. Longterm Mentality is pretty much an overview of the whole idea. I’m trying to capture my life and the essence of what I aspire to do in this business.

== Track listing ==
No.	Title	Producer(s)	Length
1.	"Real Thinkers"	Tae Beast (of Digi+Phonics)	3:46
2.	"Gone Insane"	Ayiro	4:24
3.	"Loosen My Tie"	Sounwave (of Digi+Phonics)	4:29
4.	"Nothin' New" (featuring Jhené Aiko)	AAyhasis	3:28
5.	"Hell Yeah" (featuring ScHoolboy Q)	Sounwave	4:16
6.	"Moscato" (featuring Kendrick Lamar)	Sounwave	4:39
7.	"T.D.U.D."	Context	3:28
8.	"Time is of the Essence" (featuring Punch)	Tae Beast	4:42
9.	"More of a Euphoria" (featuring Alori Joh)	Sounwave	3:16
10.	"Picture That" (featuring JaVonté)	Alexis Carrington	5:18
11.	"Big Pay Back" (featuring Murs)	Tae Beast	3:45
12.	"Almost There" (featuring BJ the Chicago Kid)	Tommy Black	4:01
13.	"#LTM" (featuring Pat Brown)	Tae Beast; Dave Free (of Digi+Phonics)	5:20
14.	"Constipation" (performed by Black Hippy) (Bonus Track)	Sounwave	3:26
Total length:			58:18

Sample credits

- "Moscato" contains a sample of "Time" performed by Morning, Noon & Night.
- "#LTM" contains a sample of "Breathe" (Jazz version), performed by Télépopmusik.

== Charts ==
Chart (2011)	Peak position
US Top R&B/Hip-Hop Albums (Billboard)	73
US Top Heatseekers (Billboard)	32
