= Section.80 =

Studio album by Kendrick Lamar
- Released: July 2, 2011
- Recorded: 2011
- Studios: TDE, Carson, California
- Genres: Conscious hip-hop; alternative rap
- Length: 59:44
- Label: TDE
- Producers: Dave Free; J. Cole; Sounwave; Tae Beast; Terrace Martin; THC; Tommy Black; Willie B; Wyldfyer

Kendrick Lamar chronology
Overly Dedicated (2010)	Section.80 (2011)	Good Kid, M.A.A.D City (2012)

Singles from Section.80
- 1. "HiiiPoWeR" Released: April 12, 2011

Section.80 is the debut studio album by the American rapper Kendrick Lamar. It was released on July 2, 2011, by Top Dawg Entertainment (TDE). In the years leading up to its release, Lamar produced various mixtapes under the moniker K.Dot. In 2010, Lamar released Overly Dedicated, his fourth solo mixtape. Shortly after its release, he began working on Section.80.

The production of Section.80 was mainly handled by TDE in-house producers from production group Digi+Phonics, as well as THC, Tommy Black, Wyldfyer, Terrace Martin and J. Cole. A concept album, it features lyrical themes delivered by Lamar such as the 1980s crack epidemic, racism and the medication tolerance of millennials. The album features guest appearances from GLC, Colin Munroe, Ashtrobot, BJ the Chicago Kid, Schoolboy Q, Ab-Soul and vocals from singer-songwriter Alori Joh.

Section.80 received generally positive reviews from critics upon its release. The album debuted at number 113 on the US Billboard 200 and as of February 2014, it has sold 130,000 copies domestically. In January 2026, it was certified platinum by the Recording Industry Association of America (RIAA).

== Background and release ==
Prior to the album's release, Kendrick Lamar released various mixtapes under the K.Dot moniker. The first of these mixtapes, titled Youngest Head Nigga in Charge, landed Lamar a recording contract with Top Dawg Entertainment. Through Top Dawg Entertainment, Lamar would release four mixtapes, including Overly Dedicated. Lamar felt compelled to create the album after seeing a friend of his go to jail for twenty-five years and experiencing the pain of such an event.

Lamar began working on the album sometime in January 2011. The album was recorded at Top Dawg Studios in Carson, California. Most of the album was written in Lamar's mother's kitchen and his tour bus. While recording the album, Lamar wished for it to be "as organic as possible," at times leaving songs unfinished for extended periods of time. The album art was released on June 29, 2011, photographed by Dave Free and designed by Hassana Lynne.

== Music and lyrics ==
Musically, Section.80 is a conscious hip-hop and alternative rap record with "stripped-down" jazz production. Its tracks contain additional elements of pop, boom bap, R&B, and "funky ventures" into southern hip-hop. Lyrically, Section.80 is a concept album that dwells on a variety of subjects, such as the 1980s crack epidemic, medication tolerance, racism, and presidency of Ronald Reagan. Lamar has stated that he created the album to discuss his generation.

=== Songs ===
Several songs on Section.80 revolve around two women, Tammy and Keisha, and their personal hardships. "Tammy's Song (Her Evils)" revolves around two girls cheating on their boyfriends after discovering they were unfaithful, and eventually sleeping with each other because they can't trust men; "Keisha's Song (Her Pain)" is about a prostitute who seeks comfort and control, only to her demise. On "A.D.H.D", Lamar addresses "getting fucked up, going to parties, and just being carefree," while "Kush & Corinthians" notes that justice and morals are rarely cut and dried. The album's lead single and final song, "HiiiPoWeR", explains the "HiiiPoWeR" movement promoted by Lamar and his Top Dawg Entertainment labelmates. The song came from Lamar's interactions with fellow rapper J. Cole and TDE president Punch.

The song "Ronald Reagan Era" features uncredited vocal recordings by RZA, which Lamar mentions in an interview with Complex in 2011 were orchestrated by DJ Fricktion from London, who at the time was working with RZA on various records. In August 2019, the song "The Spiteful Chant" was removed from streaming services without comment from Lamar or Top Dawg Entertainment. There is some speculation that the removal was the result of sample clearance issues, as "The Spiteful Chant" contains an unlicensed sample of the 2011 song "Iron" by Woodkid.

== Marketing and sales ==
Section.80 was released on July 2, 2011. In its first week, the album sold 5,000 copies in the United States and debuted at number 113 on the US Billboard 200, with minimal mainstream media promotion and coverage. Within a two-week period, the album sold a total of 9,000 copies in the United States, and as of February 2014, the album has sold 130,000 copies domestically. On January 20, 2026, the album was certified platinum by the Recording Industry Association of America (RIAA), for combined sales and album-equivalent units of over 1,000,000 units.

== Critical reception ==
Section.80 ratings
Aggregate scores
Source	Rating
Metacritic	80/100
Review scores
Source	Rating
AllMusic	3.5/5 stars
Beats Per Minute	90%
Entertainment Weekly	B
HipHopDX	4.0/5
MSN Music (Expert Witness)	B+
Pitchfork	8.0/10
PopMatters	8/10
RapReviews	8/10
Tom Hull – on the Web	B+
XXL	4/5

Section.80 was met with generally positive reviews. At Metacritic, which assigns a normalized rating out of 100 to reviews from professional publications, the album received an average score of 80, based on 11 reviews.

Andres Tardio of HipHopDX praised the album, writing that Lamar "may have been searching for answers, but that journey allowed him to find out of this year's most outstanding albums with Section.80." Reviewing the album for Pitchfork, Tom Breihan believed that, "self-serious flaws and all, Section.80 still stands as a powerful document of a tremendously promising young guy figuring out his voice." In the opinion of XXL journalist Adam Fleischer, the record reveals "its author's brain is neither lost nor useless, as he weaves together carefully constructed thoughts before spewing raps on each of the project's 16 tracks, ensuring nothing is disposable or without purpose." David Amidon from PopMatters compared Lamar to an Ice Cube early in his career, as "he's only telling us what he sees, and while he might not offer solutions as often as [Ice Cube] did, he's certainly able to paint us vivid a picture." Tom Hull said Lamar "runs a song about 'niggas and ho's' so far into the ground he can raise a flagpole in top of it, but also recalls the evils of the Reagan Era, which is pretty good for a guy who was just born as Iran-Contra piled up."

Pitchfork placed the album at number 45 on its list of the "Top 50 albums of 2011". Complex named the album the 7th best album of 2011. In honor of Section.80's fifth anniversary, Forbes columnist Ogden Payne wrote an article explaining how the album had propelled Lamar into "hip-hop royalty," deeming it "the genesis to Kendrick Lamar successfully balancing social commentary with mass appeal, while simultaneously laying the foundation for his label as King Kendrick." NME placed the album at number three on their list of "101 Albums To Hear Before You Die" in 2014.

== Track listing ==
Songwriting credits adapted from BMI and ASCAP.

Section.80 track listing
No.	Title	Writer(s)	Producer(s)	Length
1.	"Fuck Your Ethnicity"	Kendrick Duckworth; Axel Morgan	THC	3:44
2.	"Hol' Up"	Duckworth; Mark Spears	Sounwave	2:53
3.	"A.D.H.D"	Duckworth; Matthew Martin; Spears	Sounwave	3:35
4.	"No Make-Up (Her Vice)" (featuring Colin Munroe)	Duckworth; Spears; Colin Munroe	Sounwave	3:55
5.	"Tammy's Song (Her Evils)"	Duckworth; Ricci Riera; Morgan	THC	2:41
6.	"Chapter Six"	Duckworth; Fredrik Halldin	Tommy Black	2:41
7.	"Ronald Reagan Era (His Evils)"	Duckworth; Donte Perkins	Tae Beast	3:36
8.	"Poe Mans Dreams (His Vice)" (featuring GLC)	Duckworth; Greg Lawtie-Campbell; William Brown	Willie B	4:21
9.	"The Spiteful Chant" (featuring Schoolboy Q)	Duckworth; Quincy Hanley; Spears	Sounwave; Dave Free	5:20
10.	"Chapter Ten"	Duckworth; Riera; Morgan	THC	1:15
11.	"Keisha's Song (Her Pain)" (featuring Ashtrobot)	Duckworth; Perkins	Tae Beast	3:47
12.	"Rigamortis"	Duckworth; Eric Reed	Willie B; Sounwave^{[a]}	2:48
13.	"Kush & Corinthians (His Pain)" (featuring BJ the Chicago Kid)	Duckworth; Wyatt Coleman	Wyldfyer	5:04
14.	"Blow My High (Members Only)"	Duckworth; Melissa Elliott; Timothy Mosley	Tommy Black	3:35
15.	"Ab-Soul's Outro" (featuring Ab-Soul)	Duckworth; Herbert Stevens; Terrace Martin	Martin	5:50
16.	"HiiiPoWeR"	Duckworth; Jermaine Cole	J. Cole	4:39
Total length:				59:44

Notes

- ^{^[a]} signifies a co-producer
- "A.D.H.D" contains additional vocals from Ab-Soul
- "HiiiPoWer" contains additional vocals from Alori Joh

== Personnel ==
Credits are adapted from AllMusic.

- Kendrick Lamar – primary artist
- Sounwave – producer
- Terrace Martin – producer
- J. Cole – producer
- Wyldfyer – producer
- Tommy Black – producer
- Dave Free – producer
- Derek "MixedByAli" Ali – mix engineer
- Ab-Soul – featured artist
- BJ the Chicago Kid – featured artist
- Colin Munroe – featured artist
- Schoolboy Q – featured artist
- Ashtrobot – featured artist

== Charts ==
=== Weekly charts ===
Chart performance for Section.80
Chart (2011–2012)	Peak position
US Billboard 200	113
US Top R&B/Hip-Hop Albums (Billboard)	21

=== Year-end charts ===
Year-end chart performance
Chart (2012)	Position
US Top R&B/Hip-Hop Albums (Billboard)	94

== Certifications ==
Certifications
Region	Certification	Certified units/sales
Denmark (IFPI Danmark)	Gold	10,000^{‡}
New Zealand (RMNZ)	Gold	7,500^{‡}
United Kingdom (BPI)	Silver	60,000^{‡}
United States (RIAA)	Platinum	1,000,000^{‡}
^{‡} Sales+streaming figures based on certification alone.
