= Overly Dedicated =

Mixtape by Kendrick Lamar
- Released: September 14, 2010
- Recorded: 2010
- Studio: TDE Red Room (Carson, California)
- Genre: Hip-hop
- Length: 59:18
- Label: TDE
- Producer: Dave Free; Dude Dawg; Kendrick Lamar; Jairus "J-Mo" Mozee; King Blue; Drop Beatz; Sounwave; Tae Beast; Tommy Black; Willie B; Wyldfyer

Kendrick Lamar chronology
Kendrick Lamar (2009)	Overly Dedicated (2010)	Section.80 (2011)

Overly Dedicated (sometimes stylized as O(verly) D(edicated) and abbreviated as OD) is the fifth mixtape by American rapper Kendrick Lamar, released on September 14, 2010, via Top Dawg Entertainment (TDE). The mixtape features guest appearances from Dash Snow, Jhené Aiko, Schoolboy Q, Ab-Soul, Ash Riser, Dom Kennedy and Murs, among others. The album's production was handled by several TDE in-house producers, including King Blue, Sounwave, Tae Beast and Willie B; other producers such as Tommy Black, Jairus "J-Mo" Mozee, and Wyldfyer, also contributed production. The mixtape had sold a total of 12,000 copies as of October 2012.

== Background ==
On September 4, 2010, Lamar unveiled the cover art for Overly Dedicated, which was designed by Hassana Lynne and Dave Free. On September 14, 2010, the music video for "P&P 1.5", a song taken from the Kendrick Lamar EP, featuring his Black Hippy cohort Ab-Soul, was released. On September 14, Lamar also released Overly Dedicated to digital retailers under Top Dawg Entertainment, the label that signed Lamar after he released his first mixtape, when he was 17. On September 23, it was released for free download online.

Overly Dedicated includes a song titled "Ignorance Is Bliss", in which Lamar glorifies gangsta rap and street crime, but ends each verse with "ignorance is bliss," giving the message "we know not what we do." It was this song specifically that made fellow West Coast rapper and legendary hip hop producer Dr. Dre want to work with Lamar, after watching the song's music video on YouTube. This led to Lamar working with Dr. Dre and Snoop Dogg on Dre's Detox album and him considering signing to Dre's label, Aftermath Entertainment. On the topic of the project's genre, Lamar called it "human music."

== Critical reception ==
Professional ratings
Review scores
Source	Rating
Rolling Stone	3.5/5 stars
Tom Hull	A−
Vice (Expert Witness)	A−

Writing for Vice, Robert Christgau gave Overly Dedicated an "A−" and found it to be as good as Lamar's first official album Section.80 (2011): "Only three classics: the besotted "Alien Girl," the merely sexed-up "P&P 1.5," and "Average Joe," a position paper for the gangsta realism to follow. But the many cameos document a party-crashing crew utterly delighted by how good they are at this shit. There’s a sense of fun and antic possibility here Lamar abjured on his road to iconicity. In pop music, that’s a spiritual resource there’s never enough of." Mikey McCray of Creative Loafing wrote: "Compton, Calif. emcee takes his place among the best of the new West," however also wrote: "A couple tracks felt out of place. 'Michael Jordan' had a Weezy flow and Jeezy beat but the weak chorus was far from a MJ fadeaway. Don't know who was imitating Bilal on the 'ROTC (Interlude)' but they killed an otherwise stellar track with a cover fail of Common's 'The Light.'"

== Track listing ==
Overly Dedicated track listing
No.	Title	Writer(s)	Producer	Length
1.	"The Heart Pt. 2" (featuring Dash Snow)	Kendrick Duckworth; Dashiell A. Snow	The Roots	4:54
2.	"Growing Apart (To Get Closer)" (featuring Jhené Aiko)	Jhené Aiko; Duckworth; Donte Perkins	Tae Beast (of Digi+Phonics)	3:41
3.	"Night of the Living Junkies"	Duckworth; Mark Spears	Sounwave (of Digi+Phonics)	3:32
4.	"P&P 1.5" (featuring Ab-Soul)	Herbert Stevens; Brandon Blue; Duckworth	King Blue (of Sore Losers)	6:02
5.	"Alien Girl (Today, W/ Her)"	Duckworth; Spears	Sounwave	4:00
6.	"Opposites Attract (Tomorrow, W/O Her)" (featuring JaVonté)	JaVonté Pollard; Duckworth; William Brown	Willie B (of Digi+Phonics)	4:32
7.	"Michael Jordan" (featuring Schoolboy Q)	Quincy Hanley; Duckworth; Spears	Sounwave	5:51
8.	"Ignorance Is Bliss"	Duckworth; Brown	Willie B	3:28
9.	"R.O.T.C. (Interlude)" (featuring BJ the Chicago Kid)	Bryan Sledge; Duckworth; Jairus Mozee	J-Mo	2:43
10.	"Barbed Wire" (featuring Ash Riser)	Ash Riser; Duckworth; Spears	Sounwave	4:26
11.	"Average Joe"	Duckworth; Wyatt Coleman	Wyldfyer	4:16
12.	"H.O.C"	Duckworth	Drop	5:17
13.	"Cut You Off (To Grow Closer)"	Perkins; Duckworth	Tae Beast	6:04
14.	"Heaven & Hell" (featuring Alori Joh)	Duckworth; Fredrik Halldin	Tommy Black	3:12

Bonus tracks
No.	Title	Writer(s)	Producer(s)	Length
15.	"She Needs Me (Remix)" (featuring Dom Kennedy and Murs)	Nicholas Carter; Dominic Hunn; Pollard; Duckworth; Spears	Sounwave	3:16
16.	"I Do This (Remix)" (featuring U-N-I, Skeme and Brown (of Sore Losers))	Yannick Koffi; Lonnie Kimble; Yonas Semere Michael; Duckworth; Spears; Vincent Brown	Sounwave	4:08

== Charts ==
Chart (2010)	Peak position
US Top R&B/Hip-Hop Albums (Billboard)	72
US Heatseekers Albums (Billboard)	46
