= XXX (Kendrick Lamar song) =

Song by Kendrick Lamar featuring U2

from the album Damn
- Released: April 14, 2017
- Recorded: 2017
- Studio: Jungle City Studios
- Length: 4:14
- Label: Top Dawg; Aftermath; Interscope
- Songwriters: Kendrick Duckworth; Michael Williams II; Dacoury Natche; Mark Spears; Anthony Tiffith; Paul Hewson; David Evans; Adam Clayton; Larry Mullen Jr.
- Producers: Mike Will Made It; DJ Dahi; Sounwave; Top Dawg; Bēkon

"XXX" (stylized as "XXX.", pronounced "X-Rated") is a song by American rapper Kendrick Lamar, from his fourth studio album Damn, released on April 14, 2017. The eleventh track on the album (fourth on the Collector's Edition of Damn), the song was written by Lamar, Mike Will Made It, DJ Dahi, Mark Spears a.k.a. Sounwave, Anthony Tiffith, Bono, the Edge, Adam Clayton, and Larry Mullen Jr., and produced by Mike Will Made It, DJ Dahi, and Sounwave, with additional production by Top Dawg and Bēkon. The song features samples of the songs "America" by Bēkon and "American Soul" by Irish rock band U2.

The song charted in multiple countries in 2017. These countries include Ireland, New Zealand, United States of America, Canada, United Kingdom, and Sweden. Though it only appeared for 1 week for the New Zealand, Sweden, and United Kingdom charts, it stayed for 3 weeks on Ireland and United States charts, and remained on the Canada music charts for 4 weeks. The highest the song ever reached on any country's primary music chart was at number 22 in Ireland.

== Composition ==
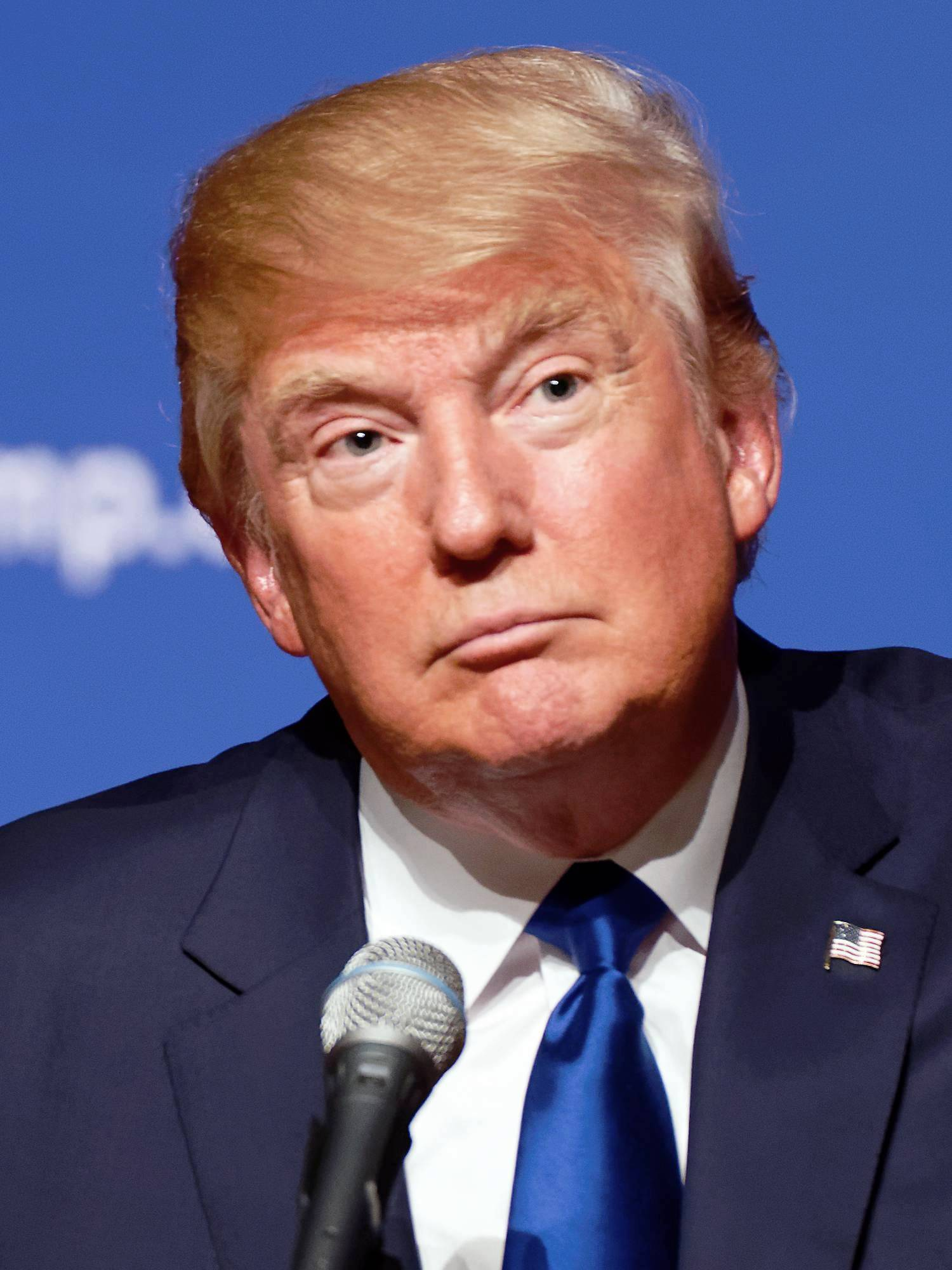
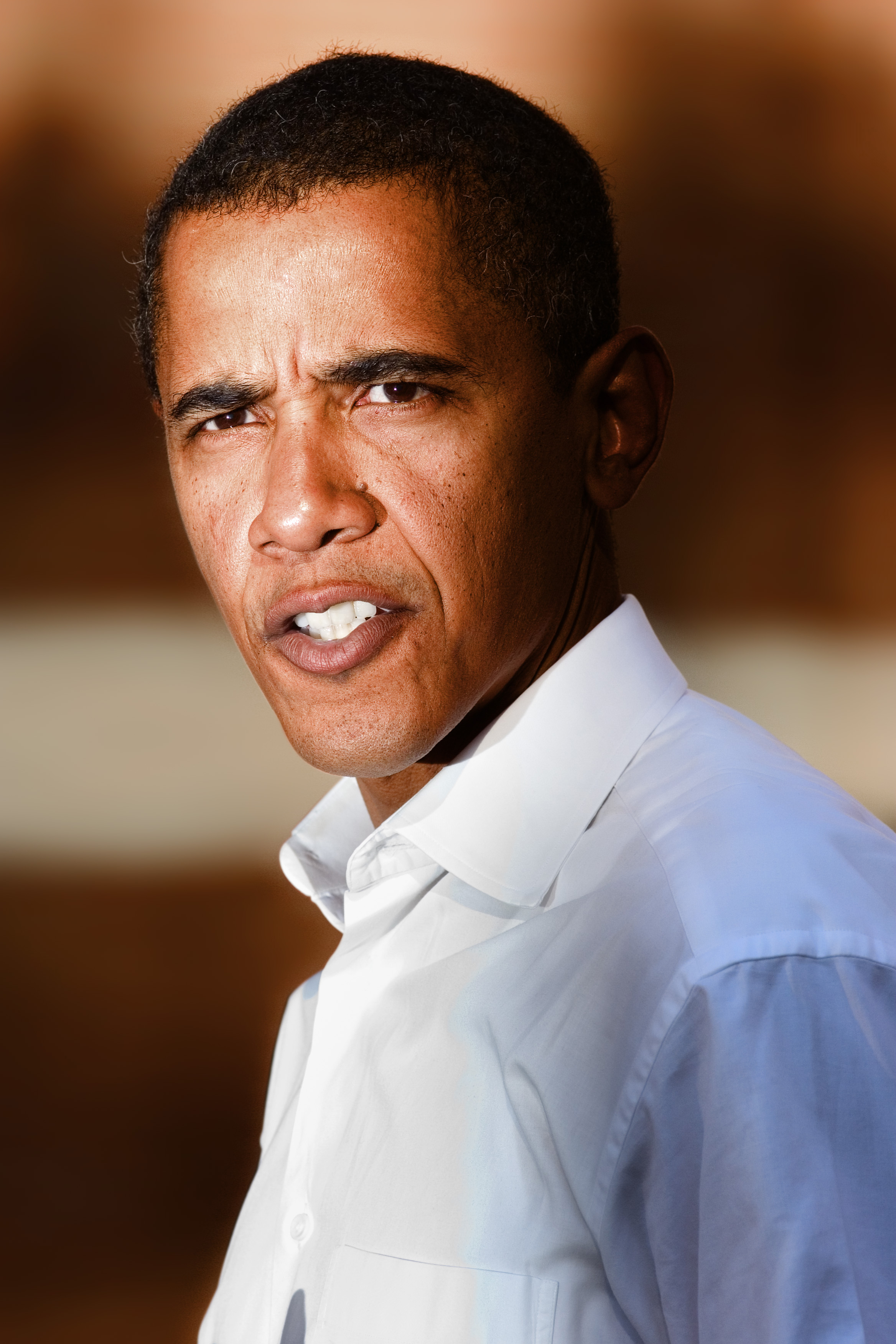
President of the United States of America Donald Trump (left) and former President of the same position Barack Obama (right) are referenced in the song.

The lyrics of "XXX" are about speaking truth to power. Some of its primary themes include violence, revenge, as well as the effect of those themes upon the political system in the United States of America. The first verse has Lamar talking about what he would do if anything happened to his family. The chorus then features Bono, the lead singer of Irish rock band U2, singing a prominent refrain in the latter half of the song. Lamar also references U.S. President Donald Trump and former President Barack Obama in the lyric, "Donald Trump's in office; we lost Barack, and promised to never doubt him again".

The song also features religious references in multiple lyrics, including "throw a steak off the ark to a pool full of sharks" to reference the common biblical story of Noah's Ark. As well, he states "K-Dot can you pray for me?" and "I know that you anointed, show me how to overcome" within one verse to showcase himself as one who acts in the Lord's favor. The song also features lines mentioning a character of "Johnny," much like his 2011 track "Little Johnny," about a boy who falls privy to gang culture.

== Critical reception ==
"XXX" received widespread acclaim from music critics. Ian Servantes of Spin called the song "damn good." Steven Hyden of Uproxx said that U2's cameo was "very un-U2-like" but in a good way. Reggie Ugwu of Buzzfeed News examined "XXX" as a whole track, stating that the song is a "hard-hitting, shapeshifting elegy" in how it relays its messages.

Journalist Alexis Rhiannon of Bustle states that there is a "whole lot to absorb" within the lyrics of the song. She cites how the use of juxtaposition between U2's interludes and Lamar's own verses makes Lamar's statements in the song about "his loss of faith in the system" able to be understood. Rhiannon also complimented Lamar's vocal performance in the song, stating "the fire in his voice points out how the American experience differs wildly from individual to individual."

The Diamondback news source paid compliments to the track, commending its messaging and stating "he’s [Lamar] fed up with violence and gun politics, but in the same breath threatens to pick off those who challenge him." The Diamondback also spoke further on the theming of the song, stating that Lamar "wrestles with the meaning of perfection" within this track.

== Live performances ==
Lamar performed "XXX" live, without U2, at the Coachella Valley Music and Arts Festival on April 23, 2017. Lamar has performed "XXX" on the Damn tour. Lamar performed "XXX" live with U2 and Dave Chappelle at the 60th Annual Grammy Awards in January 2018, with Chapelle offering a brief interlude to be mixed into the live song. Lamar and U2 performed an excerpt before transferring into a verse from "DNA". Lamar also mixed two other songs into his performance, including "New Freezer," a feature Lamar did with Rich the Kid, as well as an excerpt from his song "King's Dead" from the "Black Panther Soundtrack." Lamar utilized a visual screen in the performance to state "THIS IS A SATIRE BY KENDRICK LAMAR." Lamar also performed XXX with assistance of a visual backdrop at the 2018 Reading Festival.

== Credits and personnel ==
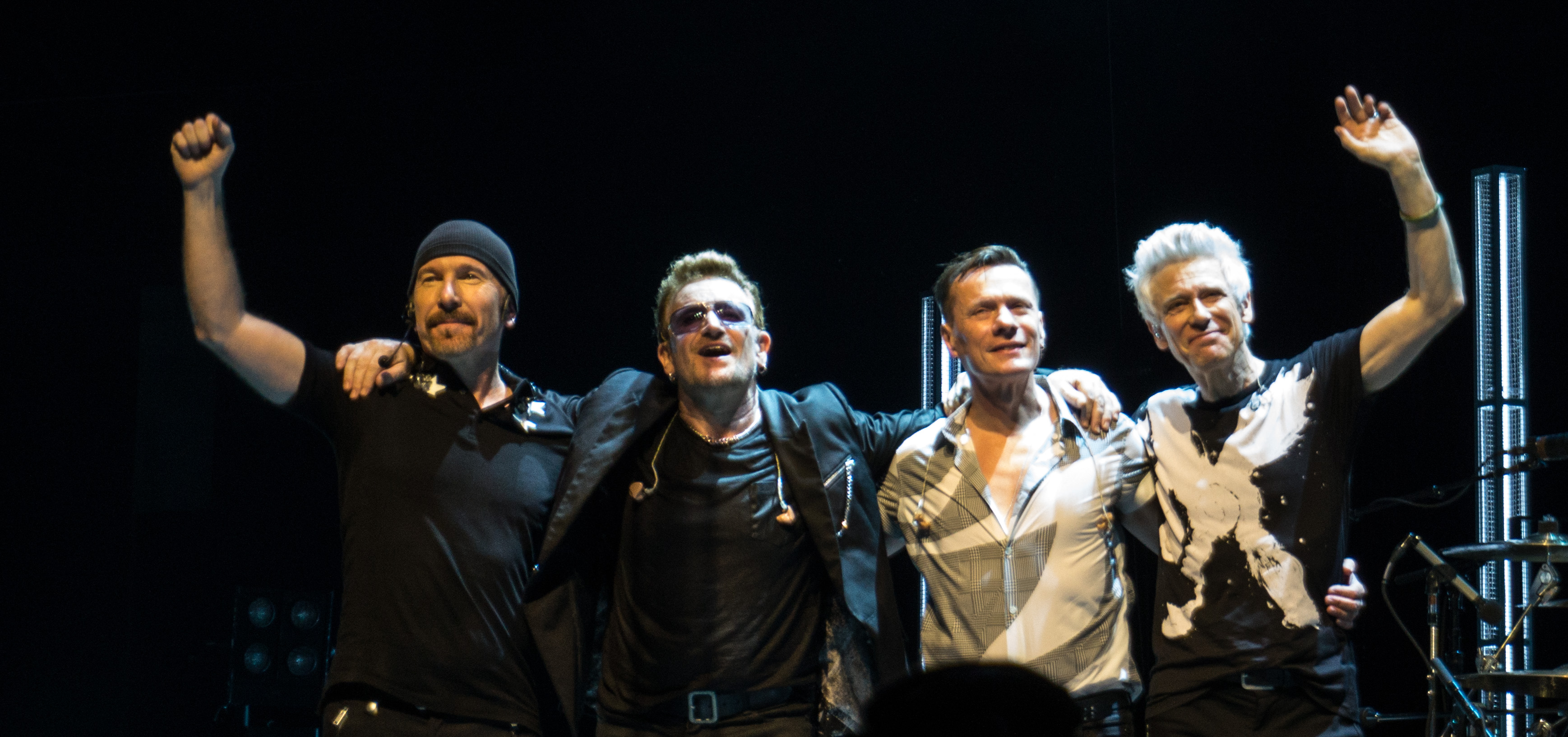
The four members of U2, the Irish rock band active since the 1970s, had never been featured on a hip hop song until their collaboration with Lamar on "XXX".

Credits adapted from the official Damn digital booklet.

- Kendrick Duckworth – songwriter, additional keys
- Mike Will Made It – songwriter, producer
- Dacoury Natche – songwriter, producer
- Mark Spears – songwriter, producer
- Anthony "Topdawg" Tiffith – songwriter, producer
- Paul Hewson (Bono) – songwriter, voice
- David Evans (The Edge) – songwriter
- Adam Clayton – songwriter
- Larry Mullen Jr. – songwriter
- Bēkon – additional production and vocals
- Kid Capri – additional vocals
- Derek Ali – mixing
- Tyler Page – mix assistant
- Cyrus Taghipour – mix assistant
- Zeke Mishanic – additional recording
- Brendan Silas Perry – additional recording

== Charts ==
Chart (2017)	Peak position
Canada Hot 100 (Billboard)	36
Czech Republic Singles Digital (ČNS IFPI)	78
France (SNEP)	126
Ireland (IRMA)	22
Netherlands (Single Top 100)	60
New Zealand (Recorded Music NZ)	31
Portugal (AFP)	30
Slovakia Singles Digital (ČNS IFPI)	46
Sweden (Sverigetopplistan)	82
UK Singles (Official Charts)	50
US Billboard Hot 100	33
US Hot R&B/Hip-Hop Songs (Billboard)	19
US Hot Rap Songs (Billboard)	15

== Certifications ==
Region	Certification	Certified units/sales
Australia (ARIA)	Platinum	70,000^{‡}
Canada (Music Canada)	Platinum	80,000^{‡}
New Zealand (RMNZ)	Gold	15,000^{‡}
United Kingdom (BPI)	Silver	200,000^{‡}
United States (RIAA)	Gold	500,000^{‡}
^{‡} Sales+streaming figures based on certification alone.
