= A.D.H.D (Kendrick Lamar song) =

2011 song by Kendrick Lamar

Song by Kendrick Lamar

from the album Section.80
- Released: July 2, 2011
- Recorded: 2011
- Genre: Hip-hop; cloud rap
- Length: 3:35
- Label: Top Dawg
- Songwriters: Kendrick Lamar; Mark Spears
- Producer: Sounwave

Music video
- "A.D.H.D" on YouTube

"A.D.H.D" is a song by American rapper Kendrick Lamar from his debut studio album, Section.80 (2011). The song was produced by frequent collaborator and Top Dawg in-house producer Sounwave, of Digi+Phonics.

== Background and theme ==
The song's name refers to attention deficit hyperactivity disorder. It addresses the high drug and medication tolerance of people born during the 1980s, who are referred to as "crack babies" in the song due to the crack epidemic that was notable during that period. Gabrielle Domanski of Exclaim! called it a "lethargic, drug-infused track".

== Critical reception ==
"A.D.H.D" received critical acclaim from music critics upon release. In his review, Pitchfork's Jordan Sargent wrote "There's the Based God's paranoia, Drake's singing/rapping fluidity, the soothing synthscapes of Wiz's mixtapes, and, of course, an obsession with drugs." He noted its simplicity, but added that "Lamar's individuality and skill as a rapper shine through" the song. Complex named "A.D.H.D" the 13th best song of 2011. The magazine wrote that "it captures the mood of today's lonely, drugged-out youth who seem more interested in Bay Area Kush and Purple Label tags than anything else." The song was also featured in Grand Theft Auto V soundtrack station in Radio Los Santos. The song was nominated to the 2013 Spike Video Game Awards for Best Song in a Game.

In his 2012 review of Lamar's second album, Dan Jackson of cmj.com called "A.D.H.D" Lamar's best song prior to the release of Good Kid, M.A.A.D City. In 2013, San Antonio Current wrote that "A.D.H.D", and the album's lead single "HiiiPoWeR", were hits that put Lamar into the national spotlight in 2011. In 2014, NPR writer Eric Ducker called "A.D.H.D" one of Lamar's three best songs. In 2018, Billboard ranked the song number eight on their list of the 20 greatest Kendrick Lamar songs, and in 2021, Rolling Stone ranked the song number six on their list of the 50 greatest Kendrick Lamar songs.

== Uncredited sample ==
The song samples the 2010 the Jet Age of Tomorrow track "The Knight Hawk". In 2017, Jet Age member Matt Martians accused Sounwave of non-payment for the sample.

== Music video ==
The music video for the song was released on August 24, 2011. It shows Lamar with his friends "cruising through a bodega and an empty office, and it gets over on pure kids-having-fun atmosphere." He said about the music video: "I wanted the video to illustrate the emotion he paints with words, while avoiding gratuitous shots of any substance. Despite the song's title and content, the focus isn't the drugs, but rather, that basic human experience of apathetic youth. That simple mood of emptiness which we choose to either address or self-medicate." The video was directed by Vashtie Kola (Va$htie), who wrote: Inspired by "A.D.H.D"s dark beat and melancholy lyrics which explore a generation in conflict, we find Kendrick Lamar in a video that illustrates the songs universal and age-old theme of apathetic youth. Shot in New York City during July of that year, "A.D.H.D" is the third video to be released from Kendrick Lamar's debut album Section.80. As of January 2026, the video has over 108 million views on YouTube.

== Live performances ==
Lamar performed the song live on October 23, 2011 at CMJ and on November 11 at a Sneaker Pimps event, both in New York City. Lamar performed the song again on July 20, 2014 at the Pitchfork Music Festival in Chicago. exclaim! writer Stephen Carlick wrote that it was "a perfect reminder that Kendrick Lamar was Kendrick Lamar before he became a Good Kid, and that the man who would be king is now firmly seated in the throne."

== Charts ==
Chart (2012)	Peak position
US Bubbling Under R&B/Hip-Hop Singles (Billboard)	8

== Certifications ==
Region	Certification	Certified units/sales
Denmark (IFPI Danmark)	Gold	45,000^{‡}
United Kingdom (BPI)	Gold	400,000^{‡}
United States (RIAA)	Gold	500,000^{‡}
^{‡} Sales+streaming figures based on certification alone.
