= Cilvia Demo =

EP by Isaiah Rashad
- Released: January 28, 2014
- Recorded: 2013–14
- Genres: Southern hip-hop; lo-fi; cloud rap
- Length: 49:29
- Label: TDE
- Producers: Anthony "Top Dawg" Tiffith (exec.); Ross Vega; Mr. Carmack; Joseph L'Étranger; Black Metaphor; The Antydote; Farhot; Chris Calor; D. Sanders; Sounwave

Isaiah Rashad chronology
Cilvia Demo (2014)	The Sun's Tirade (2016)

Cilvia Demo is the debut extended play by American rapper Isaiah Rashad. It was released on January 28, 2014, by Top Dawg Entertainment (TDE). The mixtape features guest appearances from Jean Deaux and Michael Da Vinci, as well as his Top Dawg label-mates SZA, Schoolboy Q and Jay Rock. The EP's production was handled by several record producers, namely Ross Vega, Mr. Carmack, Joseph L'Étranger, Black Metaphor, The Antydote, Farhot, Chris Calor, D. Sanders, and Digi+Phonics member Sounwave.

Cilvia Demo received universal acclaim from music critics. It was included in several year-end top album lists by critics and publications, and debuted at number 40 on the US Billboard 200, selling 8,500 copies its first week.

== Music ==
Cilvia Demo is characterized by its personal themes, such as substance abuse, fatherhood, coming of age, and police brutality. Its music incorporates stylistic and production elements of southern, experimental, and progressive hip hop. The production consists of smooth, old school influenced, downbeat southern hip-hop, with elements of experimental soul and trip hop. The project features hazy and atmospheric soundscapes of low, mid, to high-tempo beats with chopped and screwed background vocals; its abrasive main vocal set against smooth, slow burning southern-styled production.

== Critical reception ==
Professional ratings
Aggregate scores
Source	Rating
Metacritic	82/100
Review scores
Source	Rating
AllMusic	3.5/5 stars
Consequence of Sound	B
Exclaim!	8/10
HipHopDX	4.0/5
Now	4/5
Pitchfork	8.2/10
PopMatters	8/10
Spin	8/10
XXL	4/5

Cilvia Demo was met with universal acclaim from music critics upon its release. Praise was directed at the release's unconventional and experimental production, cohesiveness, and Rashad's unique style and thoughtful lyrics. At Metacritic, which assigns a normalized rating out of 100 to reviews from critics, the EP received an average score of 82, which indicates "universal acclaim", based on 13 reviews. Rob Markman of MTV gave the project a positive review saying, "By the time the 14-track project winds down, Isaiah Rashad slowly doles out his own coming-of-age story using introspective raps, melodies and, at times, good old southern bounce." Marcus Dowling of HipHopDX said, "Every story and hook on Isaiah Rashad's Cilvia Demo connects on a human level. What it lacks in depth is covered by excellent production and raw talent." Michael Madden of Consequence of Sound gave the project a positive review saying, "At any rate, Rashad sounds like he belongs. He's touched down on his own terms, and he'll be sticking around for a while." Sheldon Pearce of XXL gave the project an overwhelmingly positive review, directing praise at the album's production, lyrical content, and replay value.

American singer-songwriter Dominic Fike cited the EP as an influence on his 2018 EP Don't Forget About Me, Demos.

=== Accolades ===
Cilvia Demo appeared on multiple year-end lists of the best hip-hop albums of that year. Genius hailed it as the seventh best hip-hop release that year, while Rolling Stone placed it at number twenty-one on it year-end hip-hop albums list. SPIN included the album on its list of the 40 best hip-hop releases of 2014. Based on the buzz generated by Rashad's signing in 2013 and the EP, XXL revealed Rashad was included in their 2014 annual freshman class.

On June 29, 2016, Pitchfork Media published a list of "The 50 Best Rap Mixtapes of the Millennium". Cilvia Demo was included on the list, placed at the 35th position, despite officially being billed as an EP.

== Commercial performance ==
The EP debuted at number 40 on the US Billboard 200, selling 8,500 copies its first week.

== Track listing ==
- All tracks written by Isaiah McClain, unless otherwise denoted.

No.	Title	Writer(s)	Producer(s)	Length
1.	"Hereditary"		Ross Vega	1:28
2.	"Webbie Flow (U Like)"		Mr. Carmack	3:09
3.	"Cilvia Demo"		Joseph L'Étranger	3:16
4.	"R.I.P. Kevin Miller"		Black Metaphor	3:53
5.	"Ronnie Drake" (featuring SZA)	McClain; Solána Rowe	The Antydote	3:31
6.	"West Savannah" (featuring SZA)	McClain; Rowe	The Antydote	2:48
7.	"Soliloquy"		Farhot	1:55
8.	"Tranquility"		Farhot	4:20
9.	"Menthol" (featuring Jean Deaux)	McClain; Zoi Harris	Sounwave	2:58
10.	"Modest"		Chris Calor	3:42
11.	"Heavenly Father"		D. Sanders	4:21
12.	"Banana"		The Antydote	3:32
13.	"Brad Jordan" (featuring Michael Da Vinci)	McClain; Da Vinci	Danny Dee	4:12
14.	"Shot You Down (Remix)" (featuring Schoolboy Q and Jay Rock)	McClain; Quincy Hanley; Johnny McKinzie	Chris Calor; The Antydote	7:08
Total length:				49:29

== Charts ==
Chart (2014)	Peak position
UK R&B Albums (Official Charts)	30
US Billboard 200	40
US Independent Albums (Billboard)	8
US Top R&B/Hip-Hop Albums (Billboard)	9
