= Tommy Black (producer) =

Swedish record producer

- Birth name: Fredrik Halldin
- Origin: Vänersborg, Sweden
- Genres: Hip hop
- Occupations: Record producer; musician; songwriter; recording engineer; mixer
- Years active: 2001–present
- Labels: Top Dawg; Soblue Music Group AB

Tommy Black (born Fredrik Halldin) is a record producer and songwriter from Sweden. He has worked with Kendrick Lamar, Schoolboy Q, Dr. Dre, Big Pooh, Ab-Soul and Shade Sheist. He was one of the producers of the 5 Grammy awarded album To Pimp A Butterfly by American rapper Kendrick Lamar. In 2017, Tommy Black received the award of SKAP - The Swedish Society of Songwriters, Composers and Authors.

== Production credits ==
- Joe Lefty – HeartChakra

"The Dove"
"Dive Deep"
"Keeper"

- Chapee – Mode7ty

"Come thru"
"Sumtimes"
"Out in Space" (featuring Mapei)
"Complicated" (featuring Faye)
"We Travel" (featuring Mykestro)
"Time Is Free"
"Last Call"

- Tommy Black – The Nine Lives of Tommy Black

"The Nine Lives of Tommy Black"
"Movement"
"Delusion"
"Look Outside"
"Inside the Space Capsule"
"Moonscape"
"Streets of Atlantis"
"Sly Black & the Zodiac"
"Time Voyage"

- Kendrick Lamar – Section.80

"Chapter Six"
"Blow My High"

- Ab-Soul – Longterm Mentality

"Almost There" (featuring BJ the Chicago Kid)

- Ab-Soul – Control System

"The Book of Soul"

- Butch Cassidy – I'm here

"Street Life" (Pr1me & Drastic))

== Accolades ==
Year	Organisation	Award	Result
2017	SKAP	Hip Hop Award	Won

Grammy Awards

Year	Nominee / work	Award	Result
2016	"To Pimp a Butterfly" (as producer)	Album of the Year	Nominated
2016	"To Pimp a Butterfly" (as producer)	Best Rap Album	Won
