= Sounwave =

American record producer and songwriter (born 1986)

- Born: Mark Anthony Spears; February 28, 1986 (age 40); Los Angeles, California, U.S.
- Origin: Compton, California, U.S.
- Genres: Hip hop; pop; R&B
- Occupations: Record producer; songwriter
- Children: 1
- Years active: 1999–present
- Labels: Top Dawg; RCA
- Member of: Digi+Phonics; Red Hearse

Mark Anthony Spears (born February 28, 1986), known professionally as Sounwave, is an American record producer and songwriter. He is a frequent collaborator of rapper Kendrick Lamar, having worked on each of his projects since his 2009 self-titled extended play. Sounwave has also worked with artists such as Beyoncé, Taylor Swift, Kali Uchis, Schoolboy Q, Mac Miller, Chloe x Halle, and Bleachers. He has won eight Grammy Awards, becoming the first rap producer to win Record of the Year in consecutive years (2025-2026).

== Early life ==
Sounwave was born Mark Anthony Spears on February 28, 1986, in Los Angeles, California. His parents are elementary school sweethearts from Selma, Alabama, and relocated to Los Angeles in the 1970s so his father could pursue a dancing career for Soul Train. Spears has two older brothers and was raised in Compton. He was first inspired to pursue music after hearing the instrumentals on "Up Jumps da Boogie" by Timbaland. As a child, Spears used a Korg drum machine and a karaoke machine to create music. From there, he purchased a 4-track machine and began using the PlayStation video game MTV Music Generator (1999) to produce songs.

== Career ==
=== 1999–2009: Career beginnings ===
Spears was discovered by Terrance "Punch" Henderson, co-president of Top Dawg Entertainment (TDE), when he was 13 years old. After meeting with rapper Bishop Lamont, he produced a song for him using MTV Music Generator, which later received radio placement. He graduated from Compton High School in 2005 and was gifted an Akai MPC by his cousin; it soon became one of his primary production tools. Spears first met rapper Kendrick Lamar in a recording studio in Gardena, California. Lamar was silent until Spears played a spin of Aalon's 1977 song "Rock and Roll Gangster", which made him rush to the recording booth and rap for two minutes straight.

One year later, Spears met TDE's founder and chief executive officer Anthony "Top Dawg" Tiffith, who was originally unimpressed with him, but Spears persisted and honed his craft, and later blew Tiffith away. Spears later reconnected with Lamar and became a member of TDE's in-house production team Digi+Phonics, alongside Tae Beast, Dave Free and Willie B. His earliest work for the label includes production credits on Lamar's 2009 self titled extended play and Flo Rida's second album R.O.O.T.S.

=== 2010–2014: Recognition ===
Spears was one of the primary producers of Lamar's final mixtape Overly Dedicated (2010) and his debut studio album Section.80 (2011). For his work on the latter album, he was highlighted by Complex on their 15 New Producers to Watch list. He produced three songs on Lamar's second album Good Kid, M.A.A.D City (2012): "Bitch Don't Kill My Vibe", "M.A.A.D. City", and "Sing About Me, I'm Dying of Thirst". As a member of Digi+Phonics, he was highlighted by Complex for a second time and earned his first Grammy Award nomination for Album of the Year for his work on Good Kid, M.A.A.D City. Spears also made contributions to Schoolboy Q's second album Habits & Contradictions (2012), his third album Oxymoron, and Isaiah Rashad's debut album Cilvia Demo (both 2014).

=== 2015–present: Breakthrough and other projects ===
Spears produced a majority of Lamar's third album To Pimp a Butterfly (2015), which several publications have named as one of the best albums of the 2010s decade. At the 58th Annual Grammy Awards, he won Best Rap Song for co-writing the album's fourth single "Alright" and received a second nomination for Album of the Year. For Lamar's fourth album Damn (2017), Spears won Best Rap Album and picked up a third Album of the Year nomination at the 60th Annual Grammy Awards. In 2018, he co-wrote, produced, and handled A&R for the film soundtrack Black Panther: The Album, and contributed to singer-songwriter Kali Uchis' debut album Isolation. Black Panther: The Album received five nominations at the 61st Annual Grammy Awards, including for Album of the Year, marking the first time a soundtrack album was nominated for the honor since O Brother, Where Art Thou? (2000). Its lead single, "All the Stars", earned nominations for Best Original Song at the Academy Awards, Golden Globe Awards, and Critics' Choice Movie Awards.

In 2019, Spears contributed to several singer-songwriters, including Beyoncé's soundtrack album The Lion King: The Gift, Taylor Swift's seventh album Lover, and Mary J. Blige's single "Know". The same year, he formed the synth-pop supergroup Red Hearse with musician and producer Jack Antonoff and singer-songwriter Sam Dew. Their self-titled debut album was released through RCA Records. For his work as the primary producer of Lamar's fifth album Mr. Morale & the Big Steppers (2022), Spears won Best Rap Album for the second time at the 65th Annual Grammy Awards, and earned a fourth nomination for Album of the Year.

== Personal life ==
Spears resides in West Hills, Los Angeles with his partner, poet and songwriter Reyna Biddy, and their son, Umi.

== Discography ==
Key
‡	Indicates songs solely written or produced by Sounwave

Notable songs

Year	Song	Artist	Album	Written with	Produced with
2011	"A.D.H.D"	Kendrick Lamar	Section.80	Kendrick Duckworth	Sole production ‡
2012	"Bitch, Don't Kill My Vibe"	Kendrick Lamar	Good Kid, M.A.A.D City	Kendrick Duckworth, Robin Braun, Vindahl Friis, Lykke Schmidt	Sole production ‡
2012	"M.A.A.D City" (featuring MC Eiht)	Kendrick Lamar	Good Kid, M.A.A.D City	Kendrick Duckworth, Ricci Riera, Axel Morgan, Aaron Tyler, Quincy Hanley	THC, Terrace Martin
2012	"Sing About Me, I'm Dying of Thirst"	Kendrick Lamar	Good Kid, M.A.A.D City	—	Skhye Hutch
2015	"Alright"	Kendrick Lamar	To Pimp a Butterfly	Kendrick Duckworth, Pharrell Williams	Pharrell Williams
2015	"King Kunta"	Kendrick Lamar	To Pimp a Butterfly	—	Terrace Martin, Michael Kuhle
2016	"That Part" (featuring Kanye West)	Schoolboy Q	Blank Face LP	Quincy Hanley, Kanye West, Ronald LaTour, Daveon Jackson, Kevin Gomringer, Tim Gomringer	Cardo, Yung Exclusive, Cubeatz
2017	"Yah"	Kendrick Lamar	Damn	Kendrick Duckworth, Dacoury Natche, Anthony Tiffith	DJ Dahi, Top Dawg, Bekon
2017	"Element"	Kendrick Lamar	Damn	Kendrick Duckworth, James Blake, Ricci Riera, Daniel Tannenbaum	James Blake, Ricci Riera
2017	"Feel"	Kendrick Lamar	Damn	Kendrick Duckworth	Sole production ‡
2017	"Loyalty" (featuring Rihanna)	Kendrick Lamar	Damn	Kendrick Duckworth, Dacoury Natche, Anthony Tiffith, Robyn Fenty Bruno Mars, Philip Lawrence, Christopher Brody Brown, Robert Diggs, Russell Jones, Shawn Carter, Ricardo Thomas, Malik Cox, Calvin Broadus	DJ Dahi, Top Dawg
2017	"Lust"	Kendrick Lamar	Damn	Kendrick Duckworth, Dacoury Natche, Chester Hansen, Alexander Sowinski, Matthew Tavares, Leland Whitty	DJ Dahi, BadBadNotGood
2017	"Love" (featuring Zacari)	Kendrick Lamar	Damn	Kendrick Duckworth, Anthony Tiffith, Zacari Pacaldo, Travis Walton, Greg Kurstin	Teddy Walton, Greg Kurstin, Top Dawg
2017	"XXX" (featuring U2)	Kendrick Lamar	Damn	Kendrick Duckworth, Dacoury Natche, Anthony Tiffith, Michael Williams II, Paul Hewson, David Evans, Adam Clayton, Larry Mullen Jr.	DJ Dahi, Top Dawg, Bekon, Mike Will Made It
2017	"God"	Kendrick Lamar	Damn	Kendrick Duckworth, Ricci Riera, Dacoury Natche, Anthony Tiffith, Daniel Tannenbaum, Ronald LaTour, Travis Walton, Daveon Jackson, Mike Hector, Brock Korsan	DJ Dahi, Ricci Riera, Bekon, Cardo, Top Dawg, Yung Exclusive, Mike Hector, Teddy Walton
2018	"All the Stars"	Kendrick Lamar and SZA	Black Panther: The Album	Kendrick Duckworth, Solána Rowe, Al Shuckburgh, Anthony Tiffith	Al Shux
2018	"King's Dead"	Jay Rock, Kendrick Lamar, Future and James Blake	Black Panther: The Album	Kendrick Duckworth, Johnny McKinzie Jr., Nayvadius Wilburn, James Litherland, Samuel Gloade, Anthony Tiffith, Michael Williams, Travis Walton, Antwon Hicks, Axel Morgan	Mike Will Made It, Teddy Walton, Twon Beatz, 30 Roc
2019	"London Boy"	Taylor Swift	Lover	Taylor Swift, Jack Antonoff	
2022	"N95"	Kendrick Lamar	Mr. Morale & the Big Steppers	Kendrick Duckworth, Matthew Samuels, Jahaan Sweet, Hykeem Carter Jr., Sam Dew	Boi-1da, Jahaan Sweet, Baby Keem
2022	"Lavender Haze"	Taylor Swift	Midnights	Taylor Swift, Jack Antonoff, Zoë Kravitz, Jahaan Sweet, Sam Dew	Taylor Swift, Jack Antonoff, Jahaan Sweet
2022	"Karma"	Taylor Swift	Midnights	Taylor Swift, Jack Antonoff, Jahaan Sweet, Keanu Beats	Taylor Swift, Jack Antonoff, Keanu Beats
2024	"Euphoria"	Kendrick Lamar	Non-album single	—	Cardo, Kyuro, Johnny Juliano, Yung Exclusive
2024	"6:16 in LA"	Kendrick Lamar	Non-album single	—	Jack Antonoff
2024	"Not Like Us"	Kendrick Lamar	Non-album single	—	Mustard, Sean Momberger
2025	"Luther" (featuring SZA)	Kendrick Lamar	GNX	—	Jack Antonoff, Ruchaun "Scott Bridgeway" Akers, Kamasi Washington, Matthew "M-Tech" Bernard, Roshwita "Rose Lilah" Bacha
2025	"Gorgeous"	Doja Cat	Vie	Amala Dlamini, Jack Antonoff, George Daniel, Kurtis McKenzie, Lee Stashenko, Stavros Tsarouha	Jack Antonoff, George Daniel
2025	"Stranger"	Doja Cat	Vie	Amala Dlamini, Jack Antonoff, George Daniel, Kurtis McKenzie, Lee Stashenko, Stavros Tsarouhs	Jack Antonoff, Kurtis McKenzie, Fallen, Stavros
2026	"So Good"	Jhené Aiko	Westside Whimsy	Jhené Aiko Efuru Chilombo, Jahaan Sweet, Kendrick Duckworth, Matthew Bernard, Ruchaun Akers	Jahaan Sweet, MTech, Scott Bridgeway

Albums produced

- Beyoncé – The Lion King: The Gift (2019), Cowboy Carter (2024)
- Bleachers – Gone Now (2017)
- Chloe x Halle – Ungodly Hour (2020)
- Kali Uchis – Isolation (2018), Sin Miedo (del Amor y Otros Demonios) (2020), Red Moon in Venus (2023), Orquídeas (2024)
- Kendrick Lamar – Section.80 (2011), Good Kid, M.A.A.D City (2012), To Pimp a Butterfly (2015), Damn (2017), Mr. Morale & the Big Steppers (2022), GNX (2024)
- Taylor Swift – Lover (2019), Midnights (2022)

== Awards and nominations ==
Award	Year (Note: Indicates the year of ceremony. Each year is linked to the article about the awards held that year, wherever possible.)	Recipient(s)	Category	Result	Ref.
Academy Awards	2019	"All the Stars"	Best Original Song	Nominated	
Grammy Awards	2014	Good Kid, M.A.A.D City	Album of the Year	Nominated	
Grammy Awards	2016	"Alright"	Best Rap Song	Won	
Grammy Awards	2016	"Alright"	Song of the Year	Nominated	
Grammy Awards	2016	To Pimp a Butterfly	Album of the Year	Nominated	
Grammy Awards	2018	Damn	Best Rap Album	Won	
Grammy Awards	2018	Damn	Album of the Year	Nominated	
Grammy Awards	2019	"All the Stars"	Record of the Year	Nominated	
Grammy Awards	2019	"All the Stars"	Song of the Year	Nominated	
Grammy Awards	2019	"All the Stars"	Best Song Written for Visual Media	Nominated	
Grammy Awards	2019	Black Panther: The Album	Album of the Year	Nominated	
Grammy Awards	2019	"King's Dead"	Best Rap Song	Nominated	
Grammy Awards	2023	Mr. Morale & the Big Steppers	Best Rap Album	Won	
Grammy Awards	2023	Mr. Morale & the Big Steppers	Album of the Year	Nominated	
Grammy Awards	2025	"Not Like Us"	Record of the Year	Won	
Grammy Awards	2025	"Not Like Us"	Song of the Year	Won	
Grammy Awards	2025	"Not Like Us"	Best Rap Song	Won	
Grammy Awards	2026	GNX	Album of the Year	Nominated	
Grammy Awards	2026	"Luther"	Record of the Year	Won	
Grammy Awards	2026	"Luther"	Song of the Year	Nominated	
Grammy Awards	2026	"TV Off"	Best Rap Song	Won	
Grammy Awards	2026	Himself	Producer of the Year, Non-Classical	Nominated	
Golden Globe Awards	2019	"All the Stars"	Best Original Song	Nominated	
Guild of Music Supervisors Awards	2019	"All the Stars"	Best Song Written and/or Recording Created for a Film	Nominated	
Hollywood Music in Media Awards	2018	"All the Stars"	Best Original Song in a Sci-Fi, Fantasy or Horror Film	Won	
