= Digi+Phonics =

American hip-hop production team from California

- Origin: Los Angeles, California, U.S.
- Genres: Hip hop
- Occupation: Record producers
- Years active: 2005–present
- Label: Top Dawg Entertainment
- Members: Tae Beast; Sounwave; Willie B
- Past members: Dave Free

Digi+Phonics is an American hip hop production team, composed of California-based record producers Tae Beast, Sounwave, and Willie B, while Dave Free is a former original member and co-founder, having left to focus on his PGLang company. They currently serve as the main in-house producers for Carson-based record label, Top Dawg Entertainment (TDE). Digi+Phonics work significantly on projects from all the members of former hip hop supergroup Black Hippy, who were also signed to Top Dawg and was composed of rappers Kendrick Lamar (who left TDE on 2022), Jay Rock, Schoolboy Q, and Ab-Soul. Their best known productions include "Bitch Don't Kill My Vibe" by Kendrick Lamar, "There He Go" by Schoolboy Q, and "Terrorist Threats" by Ab-Soul. They frequently co-produce songs together and put the finishing touches on the projects released by Top Dawg Entertainment.

== History ==
Tae Beast grew up in the Los Angeles, California, area. He started producing for Black Hippy members Kendrick Lamar, Jay Rock, ScHoolboy Q and Ab-Soul. In November 2012, Complex named Digi Phonics (Sounwave, Tae Beast, Willie B & Dave Free) as one of the "Top 25 New Producers to Watch Out For". In July 2013, BET named Digi+Phonics as a group, as one of the top ten young producers on the rise. Members of the group also worked on ScHoolboy Q's major label debut album Oxymoron.

== Members ==
=== TaeBeast ===
Donte Perkins, better known by his stage name TaeBeast, is an American record producer from Los Angeles, California. His is influenced by the likes of J Dilla, RZA and Kanye West.

TaeBeast originally got linked up with Top Dawg Entertainment (TDE) after playing a few beats for Black Hippy's Ab-Soul, in 2010, one of which became "Turn Me Up". Soon after he had a meeting with TDE, it resulted in him signing with the record label as a producer. On July 15, 2010, Tae Beast released his first project, an instrumental mixtape titled The Tae Beast Tape. On October 1, 2012, he released the sequel to his first mixtape, aptly titled The Tae Beast Tape 2. In early 2014, he earned placement on ScHoolboy Q's album Oxymoron by producing "Grooveline Pt. 2" and produced the song "Alright" by Logic featuring Big Sean. He then produced two songs on Ab-Soul's third studio album These Days....

TaeBeast is known for his drum loops and sample chopping in his productions. His best known productions include Kendrick Lamar's "Hood Politics", ScHoolboy Q's "Groovy Tony", Mac Miller's "Small Worlds" and J. Cole's "Punchin' the Clock". He has produced for Kendrick Lamar, ScHoolboy Q, Jay Rock, Ab-Soul, Sir, Mac Miller, Logic, Jhené Aiko, Big Sean, Young Thug, J. Cole and others.

=== Sounwave ===
Mark Anthony Spears, better known by his stage name Sounwave, is an American record producer from Compton, California. Sounwave credits "Up Jumps da Boogie" by Timbaland as the first hip hop instrumental he ever listened to. From the age of ten he started using a Korg drum machine to make simple drum beats. From there, he graduated to a 4-track machine and then to the MTV Music Generator for PlayStation. After using that for a while he hooked up with rapper Bishop Lamont from Carson, California, and a song he produced for him with MTV Music Generator received local radio placement. In 2005, Sounwave was originally discovered by Top Dawg Entertainment co-founder Terrence "Punch" Henderson, who had him meet with TDE CEO, Anthony "Top Dawg" Tiffith. Anthony "Top Dawg" Tiffith was originally unimpressed with Sounwave, however, he persisted and honed his craft which ended up "blowing away" Tiffith.

Sounwave's earliest work for Top Dawg Entertainment surfaced on the self-titled Kendrick Lamar EP, and Jay Rock's compilation track "Fa Sho" in 2009 and 2010 respectively. In 2011, Sounwave produced a bulk of Kendrick Lamar's mixtape/album Section.80, which landed him on Complex's "15 New Producers to Watch" list. He also produced three songs on Lamar's critically acclaimed second album Good Kid, M.A.A.D City (2012). Sounwave is best known for producing Kendrick Lamar's hit single "Bitch Don't Kill My Vibe", among other songs such as "M.A.A.D. City", "A.D.H.D" and ScHoolboy Q's "There He Go". Then in 2014, he earned placement on Top Dawg Entertainment artist Isaiah Rashad's Cilvia Demo and produced "Hoover Street" and "Prescription/Oxymoron" on ScHoolboy Q's Oxymoron. He also is known for not significantly producing for artists outside of the Top Dawg Entertainment label, except "Finally Here" by Flo Rida from his second album R.O.O.T.S. (2009). Sounwave is also credited with production on four tracks on ScHoolboy Q's fourth studio album, Blank Face LP. He was a major contributor to Black Panther: The Album. In 2019, Sounwave co-wrote the song "London Boy" with Taylor Swift and Jack Antonoff, produced by Swift and Antonoff, a co-production by Sounwave, for Swift's seventh studio album Lover (2019). In 2022, Sounwave co-wrote and co-produced on Swift's tenth studio album Midnights (2022), including "Lavender Haze", "Karma", and "Glitch".

=== Dave Free ===
David Friley, better known by the names Dave Free, Dee.Jay.Dave, or Miyatola serves as a member of Digi+Phonics, former president of Top Dawg Entertainment, a music video director and Kendrick Lamar's manager. When co-directing music videos alongside Lamar, they are collectively known as The Little Homies. Shortly after launching Top Dawg Entertainment and signing Jay Rock, Anthony "Top Dawg" Tiffith reached out to Kendrick Lamar's childhood friend Dave Free to serve as president and general manager of the record label. During 2004 he served as social media director of the label. By February 2006, he had been promoted to president of the TDE.

He is best known for producing Ab-Soul's song "Terrorist Threats". Recently he has been more involved with the business side of Top Dawg Entertainment rather than producing. In 2020, Free co-founded production company PGLang, alongside Lamar. On January 13, 2022, it was announced that he is going to produce an untitled film with Lamar through PGLang as well as Trey Parker and Matt Stone through Parker County, and distributed by Paramount Pictures.

=== Willie B ===
Willie Brown better known by his stage names Willie B and The Ichiban Don, is American hip hop recording artist and record producer that began producing professionally in 2006. On January 6, 2011, Willie B released a mixtape titled I'm Not a Producer hosted by DJ Age & featuring guest appearances from Jay Rock, Talib Kweli, Busta Rhymes, Little Brother, Crooked I, Kendrick Lamar, Bishop Lamont, Glasses Malone, and Kurupt. He is best known for producing Kendrick Lamar's "Ignorance Is Bliss" and "Rigamortis" from Lamar's Overly Dedicated and Section.80, respectively. He has also produced Ab-Soul's "Black Lip Bastard", and ScHoolboy Q's "Gangsta in Designer (No Concept)", from his second studio album Habits & Contradictions, among other songs for TDE. Outside of TDE he has produced for artists such as Freddie Gibbs, Childish Gambino, Wale and Apollo the Great, among others. On July 27, 2013, he released the first ever Instagram-only instrumental mixtape.
