= Top Dawg Entertainment =

American record label

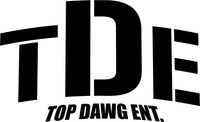
- Founded: 2004; 22 years ago
- Founder: Anthony Tiffith
- Distributors: Universal Music Group; Warner Music Group; Sony Music Entertainment
- Genre: Hip hop; R&B; alternative
- Country of origin: United States
- Location: Carson, California, U.S.
- Official website: topdawgent.com

Top Dawg Entertainment (TDE) is an American independent record label. Specializing in hip hop and R&B artists, TDE is based in Carson, California. The label was founded in 2004 by record producer and record executive Anthony "Top Dawg" Tiffith, who is the chief executive officer. His sons, Anthony "Moosa" Tiffith Jr and Brandon Tiffith, serve as the label's president and chief marketing officer, respectively. Terrence "Punch" Henderson also serves as a label president.

TDE concentrates on artist management, publishing and merchandising, and has worked with the "Big Three" record companies (Universal Music Group, Warner Music Group, and Sony Music Entertainment) for distribution ventures. The label also oversees subsidiaries such as TDE Films and their sports agency. The label is most notable for being the label that represented Kendrick Lamar, who was signed from 2005 to 2022, as he rose to stardom. There are currently twelve artists signed to TDE; its flagship artists include SZA, Doechii, Jay Rock, Ab-Soul, and ScHoolboy Q.

== History ==
=== 2004–2007: Foundation ===
Top Dawg Entertainment was founded in 2004 by Anthony Tiffith, a record producer who previously worked with rappers The Game and Juvenile, among others. After his uncle found success as a manager for singer Rome, whose single "I Belong to You (Every Time I See Your Face)" was a major hit, Tiffith began scouting local talent as an escape from the street life of his Watts neighborhood. He built a recording studio, dubbed it "House of Pain", and established the record label based on his nickname, Top Dawg. TDE's first signing was Jay Rock, who joined the label in 2005. Two weeks after his acquisition, Kendrick Lamar was signed to the label. In 2007, TDE signed Ab-Soul, while rapper Terrence "Punch" Henderson and record producer Dave Free assumed the role as presidents of the label. Jay Rock signed joint venture contracts with Warner Bros. Records and Asylum Records, but left after the labels failed to properly distribute his debut album Follow Me Home (2011).

=== 2008–2013: Joint ventures and breakthrough ===
The label released their first compilation mixtape, Do It Nigga Squad, Volume 1, in May 2008, which featured appearances from Lil Wayne and will.i.am. ScHoolboy Q, who had been affiliated with the label since 2006, signed with TDE in 2009. Before signing, the four rappers created the hip hop supergroup Black Hippy. In March 2012, The Fader reported that TDE closed a joint venture deal with Aftermath Entertainment and Interscope Records. Under the agreement, Lamar signed to Aftermath and Interscope, while ScHoolboy Q joined Interscope. TDE partnered with BET for their Music Matters Tour in July, and held its first "appreciation week" for their fans in August.

Lamar's second studio album, Good Kid, M.A.A.D City, was released in October 2012 and debuted at number two on the US Billboard 200 chart and earned the highest first-week sales of the year by a male rapper. It later became the first hip hop studio album to spend ten consecutive years on the Billboard 200. On August 15, 2013, singer-songwriter SZA signed with TDE, becoming the first female artist to join the label. The label announced the signing of rapper Isaiah Rashad on September 20, after publications reported on his acquisition in June. Lamar, Jay Rock, ScHoolboy Q, Ab-Soul and Rashad were featured in a TDE cypher at the 2013 BET Hip Hop Awards.

=== 2014–2017: Signings and recognition ===
At the 56th Annual Grammy Awards (January 2014), Good Kid, M.A.A.D City earned seven nominations, including for Best Rap Album and Album of the Year. Tiffith announced that TDE would be releasing six projects in 2014, beginning with Rashad's debut album Cilvia Demo. ScHoolboy Q released his third album Oxymoron on February 25, while SZA released her third extended play Z on April 8. Oxymoron earned the biggest first-week streams of 2014 on Spotify (3.3 million). Ab-Soul released his third album, These Days..., on June 24. To Pimp a Butterfly (2015), Lamar's third album, became TDE's first project to debut atop the Billboard 200 and set Spotify's global first-day streaming record (9.6 million). It won five awards at the 58th Annual Grammy Awards, including Best Rap Album.

TDE previewed releases from the roster on February 29, 2016, and hinted at signing new artists. Singer and rapper Lance Skiiiwalker signed to the label on May 20, and released his debut album Introverted Intuition on October 18. On January 19, 2017, TDE announced the signing of singer SiR. Lamar's fourth album, Damn, spent four nonconsecutive weeks atop the Billboard 200 and yielded TDE's first number-one single on the Billboard Hot 100, "Humble". SZA signed a joint recording contract with RCA Records on April 28, and her debut studio album, Ctrl, debuted at number three on the Billboard 200.

=== 2018–present: Spotify criticisms and Lamar's departure ===
Damn won five awards at the 60th Annual Grammy Awards (January 2018), including for Best Rap Album. Ctrl received four nominations at the ceremony, including for Best Urban Contemporary Album. SiR released his second album, November, on January 19. On February 9, TDE released Black Panther: The Album, the soundtrack album for the Marvel Studios superhero film Black Panther. It was curated and executive produced by Lamar and Tiffith. From May to June, artists embarked on TDE's first full-label tour, The Championship Tour. During the tour, Tiffith and Lamar entered into a publicized dispute with Spotify over their Hate Content & Hateful Conduct policy, which removed artists such as XXXTentacion and R. Kelly from their editorial and algorithmic playlists due to their respective legal issues. Tiffith, along with Henderson, claimed that the policy promoted censorship, and threatened to pull TDE's catalog from the platform if they kept the policy as it stood. Spotify reversed their policy in response to the criticism and reinstated XXXTentacion's music back onto playlists after other artists followed suit in threatening to pull their musical works.

Jay Rock signed a joint contract with Interscope Records, and released his third album Redemption on June 15, 2018. Rapper Reason joined the label on August 8. On January 25, 2019, TDE announced the signing of singer Zacari, who has been affiliated with the label since 2017. He released his first extended play, Run Wild Run Free, on March 15. ScHoolboy Q released his fifth album, Crash Talk, on April 26. SiR signed a joint contract with RCA Records and released his third album Chasing Summer on August 30.

Rolling Stone reported that Dave Free left the label in October 2019; his position as co-president was later succeeded by Tiffith's son, Anthony "Moosa" Tiffith Jr. After rumors emerged of his departure in 2020, Lamar confirmed that he was producing his final album under TDE on August 20, 2021. Five days later, the label announced the signing of rapper Ray Vaughn, who began working with them in 2020. On March 31, 2022, TDE partnered with Capitol Records and signed rapper Doechii. She is the second female rapper to join the label. SZA's second studio album, SOS (2022), broke several Billboard chart records and spawned TDE's second number-one single "Kill Bill".

In September 2024, singer-songwriter Alemeda was announced as the new signee to the label in collaboration with Warner Records. In March 2026, South Carolina rapper Trap Dickey was signed to the label in partnership with 11 Music Group LLC.

== Other ventures ==
=== Philanthropy ===
TDE has held their annual Christmas concert and toy drive in Nickerson Gardens since 2014. The concerts featured performances by the roster, and included guest appearances from Rihanna, E-40, and Chris Brown. In February 2018, the label and Interscope Records purchased five screenings of Black Panther in three theaters to allow 1,000 children from three Watts public housing complexes to view the film for free. In the midst of the COVID-19 pandemic, Tiffith paid the rent of over 300 families in Los Angeles' public housing developments.

=== Sports ===
TDE established a sports division agency in January 2018, led by agent Faddie Mikhail. American football player Derrius Guice became the first athlete to sign with the agency.

=== TDE Films ===
On November 8, 2016, TDE announced the creation of their film production company TDE Films, and began looking for writers, producers, and directors. For their work on Lamar's "Alright" and "Humble", the division has won the Grammy Award for Best Music Video twice.

On March 11, 2025, Deadline Hollywood reported that TDE Films would produce along with Rob Friedman, the upcoming 20th Century Studios acquired action horror film The Zone, directed by Dallas Johnson, from an original script by David Hayter.

== Artists ==
=== Current ===
Act	Year signed	Releases under the label	Other labels
Punch	2004	—	—N/a
Jay Rock	2005	13	Interscope
Ab-Soul	2007	7	—N/a
ScHoolboy Q	2009	6	Interscope
SZA	2013	3	RCA
Isaiah Rashad	2013	4	Warner
Lance Skiiiwalker	2016	4	Rocketeer
SiR	2017	4	RCA
Zacari	2019	2	—N/a
Ray Vaughn	2020	2	—N/a
Kal Banx	2021	2	—N/a
Doechii	2022	2	Capitol
Devin Malik	2024	1	BMR
Alemeda	2024	2	Warner
iAMLYRIC	2025	—	RCA
Trap Dickey	2026	1	11 Music Group
A Room Full of Mirrors	2026	1	RCA
Yakiyn	2026	—	Capitol

=== Former ===
Act	Tenure	Releases under the label
Kendrick Lamar	2005–2022	12
Black Hippy	2008–2022	—
Reason	2018–2024	4

=== In-house producers === ==== Current ==== : Anthony "Top Dawg" Tiffith; Willie B; Sounwave; Digi+Phonics; Tae Beast; Kal Banx; Devin Malik	==== Former ==== : Dave Free

== Discography ==
The discography of Top Dawg Entertainment currently consists of 25 studio albums, two compilation albums, six extended plays (EPs) and 17 mixtapes. Overall the label has sold more than ten million records in the US alone.
