= The Championship Tour =

2018 concert tour by artists of Top Dawg Entertainment

- Continental tour by Top Dawg Entertainment
- Promotional poster
- Location: North America
- Associated albums: Various
- Start date: May 4, 2018
- End date: June 16, 2018
- Legs: 1
- No. of shows: 30
Kendrick Lamar tour chronology
The Damn Tour (2017–2018)	The Championship Tour (2018)	The Big Steppers Tour (2022–2024)
SZA tour chronology
Ctrl the Tour (2017–2018)	The Championship Tour (2018)	Good Days Fall Tour (2021)

The Championship Tour was a co-headlining concert tour by the independent record label Top Dawg Entertainment. The tour featured artists Kendrick Lamar, SZA, ScHoolboy Q, Jay Rock, Ab-Soul, Sir, and Lance Skiiiwalker. The tour began in Vancouver on May 4, 2018, and concluded in Burgettstown on June 16, 2018.

== Background ==
Top Dawg Entertainment announced their first ever record label tour to promote major releases from 2017 and 2018 with Lamar's Damn, SZA's Ctrl, Sir's November, and their collaborative Black Panther soundtrack.

== Set list ==
The set list is from the concert on May 4, 2018, in Vancouver, Canada. It is not intended to represent all tour dates.

SiR

1. "War"
2. "I Know"
3. "D'Evils"

Jay Rock

4. "Easy Bake"
5. "Vice City"

Ab-Soul

6. "Terrorist Threats"

ScHoolboy Q

7. "That Part"
8. "What They Want"
9. "Studio"
10. "Dope Dealer"
11. "Something Foreign" (with SiR)
12. "Hell of a Night"
13. "Collard Greens"
14. "Break the Bank"
15. "John Muir"
16. "Man of the Year"

SZA

17. "Supermodel"
18. "Broken Clocks"
19. "Go Gina"
20. "Drew Barrymore"
21. "Aftermath"
22. "Doves in the Wind"
23. "Wavy"
24. "Garden (Say It Like Dat)"
25. "Love Galore"
26. "The Weekend"

Kendrick Lamar

27. "DNA."
28. "ELEMENT."
29. "King Kunta"
30. "Untitled 07 | 2014–2016"
31. "Goosebumps"
32. "New Freezer"
33. "Swimming Pools (Drank)"
34. "Backseat Freestyle"
35. "LOYALTY."
36. "Money Trees" (with Jay Rock)
37. "King's Dead" (with Jay Rock)
38. "LUST."
39. "XXX."
40. "M.A.A.D City"
41. "Love" (with Zacari)
42. "X" (with Schoolboy Q)
43. "All The Stars" (with SZA)
44. "Bitch, Don't Kill My Vibe"
45. "Alright"
46. "HUMBLE."

== Shows ==
List of concerts, showing date, city, country, venue, opening acts, tickets sold, number of available tickets and amount of gross revenue
Date	City	Country	Venue	Attendance	Revenue
May 4, 2018	Vancouver	Canada	Rogers Arena	—	—
May 5, 2018	Auburn	United States	White River Amphitheatre	—	—
May 6, 2018	Ridgefield	United States	Sunlight Supply Amphitheater	—	—
May 8, 2018	Oakland	United States	Oracle Arena	12,325 / 12,325	$1,403,906
May 10, 2018	Inglewood	United States	The Forum	26,262 / 26,262	$2,888,837
May 11, 2018	Inglewood	United States	The Forum	26,262 / 26,262	$2,888,837
May 13, 2018	Chula Vista	United States	Mattress Firm Amphitheatre	—	—
May 14, 2018 (Note: SZA did not perform due to swollen vocal cords.)	Phoenix	United States	Ak-Chin Pavilion	15,012 / 18,998	$751,303
May 15, 2018	Albuquerque	United States	Isleta Amphitheater	14,390 / 14,763	$867,9997
May 17, 2018	Dallas	United States	Starplex Pavilion	14,367 / 19,393	$685,911
May 18, 2018	Austin	United States	Austin360 Amphitheater	11,799 / 11,799	$784,084
May 19, 2018	The Woodlands	United States	Cynthia Woods Mitchell Pavilion	14,382 / 14,382	$800,363
May 22, 2018	Tampa	United States	MidFlorida Credit Union Amphitheatre	—	—
May 23, 2018	West Palm Beach	United States	Coral Sky Amphitheatre	—	—
May 25, 2018	Atlanta	United States	Cellairis Amphitheatre	14,754 / 18,898	$734,414
May 26, 2018	Raleigh	United States	Coastal Credit Union Music Park	15,976 / 19,891	$720,118
May 27, 2018	Virginia Beach	United States	Veterans United Home Loans Amphitheater	12,945 / 20,017	$543,632
May 29, 2018	New York City	United States	Madison Square Garden	12,497 / 12,497	$1,394,093
May 30, 2018	Wantagh	United States	Jones Beach Theater	—	—
June 1, 2018	Bristow	United States	Jiffy Lube Live	—	—
June 2, 2018	Hershey	United States	Hersheypark Stadium	—	—
June 3, 2018	Darien	United States	Darien Lake Performing Arts Center	—	—
June 5, 2018	Mansfield	United States	Xfinity Center	—	—
June 7, 2018	Hartford	United States	Xfinity Theatre	—	—
June 8, 2018	Camden	United States	BB&T Pavilion	—	—
June 9, 2018	Saratoga Springs	United States	Saratoga Performing Arts Center	—	—
June 12, 2018	Toronto	Canada	Budweiser Stage	—	—
June 13, 2018	Clarkston	United States	DTE Energy Music Theatre	—	—
June 15, 2018	Tinley Park	United States	Hollywood Casino Amphitheatre	—	—
June 16, 2018	Burgettstown	United States	KeyBank Pavilion	—	—
Total				—	—
