= Yay Yay =

Promotional single by Schoolboy Q
- Released: April 16, 2013
- Recorded: 2013
- Genre: Hip hop
- Length: 4:31
- Label: TDE; Interscope
- Songwriter: Quincy Hanley
- Producers: Boi1da; The Maven Boys (co.)

Schoolboy Q chronology
"Hands on the Wheel" (2012)	"Yay Yay" (2013)	"Collard Greens" (2013)

"Yay Yay" is a song by American hip hop recording artist Schoolboy Q, released on April 16, 2013 as the first song in promotion of his major-label debut album, Oxymoron (2014). It charted at number 49 on the US Hot R&B/Hip-Hop Songs chart in January 2014 after being put up with the album's pre-order. It was ultimately included as an iTunes exclusive bonus track on the digital deluxe edition of the album.

== Background ==
Schoolboy Q first premiered the song on March 22, 2013. It was produced by Canadian record producers Boi-1da and The Maven Boys. The song was described by Schoolboy Q as a "coming of age drug tale." On April 16, 2013 "Yay Yay" was released as a digital download. In a March interview with Vibe, after the interviewer referred to the song as the album's first single, Schoolboy Q stated "["Yay Yay"] is not a single, but it's a record we put out there." It was conclusively deemed a buzz single. In April, Schoolboy Q announced that an official remix of the song would be released featuring American rapper Young Jeezy. However, in August 2013, he would later tell MTV that the remix had not come together and would not be released.

== Chart performance ==
Chart (2014)	Peak position
US Hot R&B/Hip-Hop Songs (Billboard)	49
