= Nez & Rio =

American record production duo from Illinois

- Born: Nesbitt Wesonga Jr. and Mario Loving
- Origin: Chicago, Illinois, U.S.
- Genres: Hip hop; R&B; pop
- Years active: 2010–present

Nez & Rio are an American record production team from Chicago, Illinois, composed of Nesbitt Wesonga Jr. and Mario Loving. They are perhaps best known for producing Schoolboy Q's 2014 single "Man of the Year," as well as ASAP Rocky's 2015 single "Lord Pretty Flacko Jodye 2". Throughout their career, they have worked with artists such as Schoolboy Q, ASAP Rocky, Vic Mensa, Arin Ray, Tinashe, Kendrick Lamar, Ab-Soul and Chance the Rapper, as well as others from their hometown Treated Crew.

== History ==
Nez and Rio grew up together in Chicago, Illinois, attending the same elementary school and high school, as well as college at Howard University. In 2015, Nez and Rio were nominated for Best Rap Album for their work on Schoolboy Q's album Oxymoron. In late 2015, Nez and Rio announced they were working on their own project, with an album forthcoming.

== Production discography ==
=== Singles ===
2012

- "Druggys with Hoes Again" (Schoolboy Q featuring Ab-Soul)
- "SOPA" (Ab-Soul featuring Schoolboy Q)

2014

- "Man of the Year" (Schoolboy Q)

2015

- "Lord Pretty Flacko Jodye 2" (ASAP Rocky)

2018

- "Bag Talk" (Joey Purp)

=== Album cuts ===
==== 2010 ====
Vic Mensa - Straight Up

- 03. "Lights Out"
- 06. "Too Hard (Lite)"

==== 2012 ====
Schoolboy Q - Habits & Contradictions

- 17. "Niggahs.already.know.davers.flow"

Tinashe - Reverie

- 04. "Slow"
- 11. "Who Am I Working For?"

King L - Drilluminati

- 02. "Band Nation"

==== 2013 ====
King L - March Madness

- 22. "Michael Jordan"

==== 2014 ====
Schoolboy Q - Oxymoron

- 01. "Gangsta"
- 15. "Fuck LA"
- 17. "Californication" (featuring ASAP Rocky)

==== 2015 ====
Tinashe - Amethyst

- 03. "Something to Feel"

==== 2016 ====
Schoolboy Q - Blank Face LP

- 01. "Torch"
- 13. "Str8 Ballin'"
- 17. "Tookie Knows II" (featuring Traffic and TF)

==== 2017 ====
Wale - Shine

- 09. "Fish n Grits" (featuring Travis Scott)

== Awards and nominations ==
=== Grammy Awards ===
Year	Nominee / work	Award	Result
Oxymoron	Best Rap Album	Nominated	
