= JayFrance =

American music producer (born 1993)

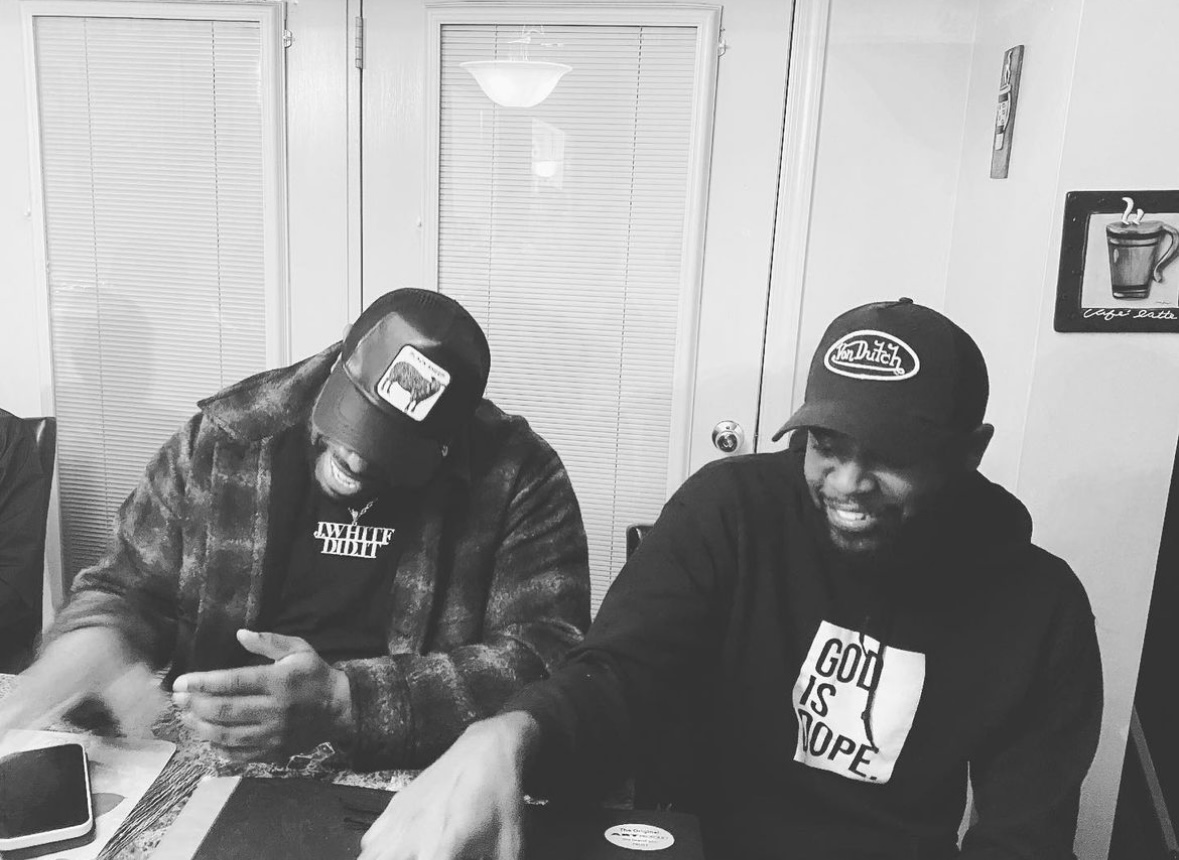
- Undated photograph of JayFrance (right) with fellow record producer J. White Did It (left)

Background information
- Also known as: Micah J Foxx, JF, Jay France
- Born: Javin France; February 23, 1993 (age 33); St. Louis, Missouri, U.S.
- Genres: Hip-hop
- Occupations: Record producer; songwriter
- Instruments: FL Studio; Logic Pro
- Years active: 2014–present

Javin France (born February 23, 1993), known professionally as JayFrance, is an American record producer from St. Louis, Missouri. He has produced songs for artists such as Wiz Khalifa, TrackBoyz, Schoolboy Q, Juicy J, Flo Rida, The Audibles, and Fetty Wap among others.

== Music career ==
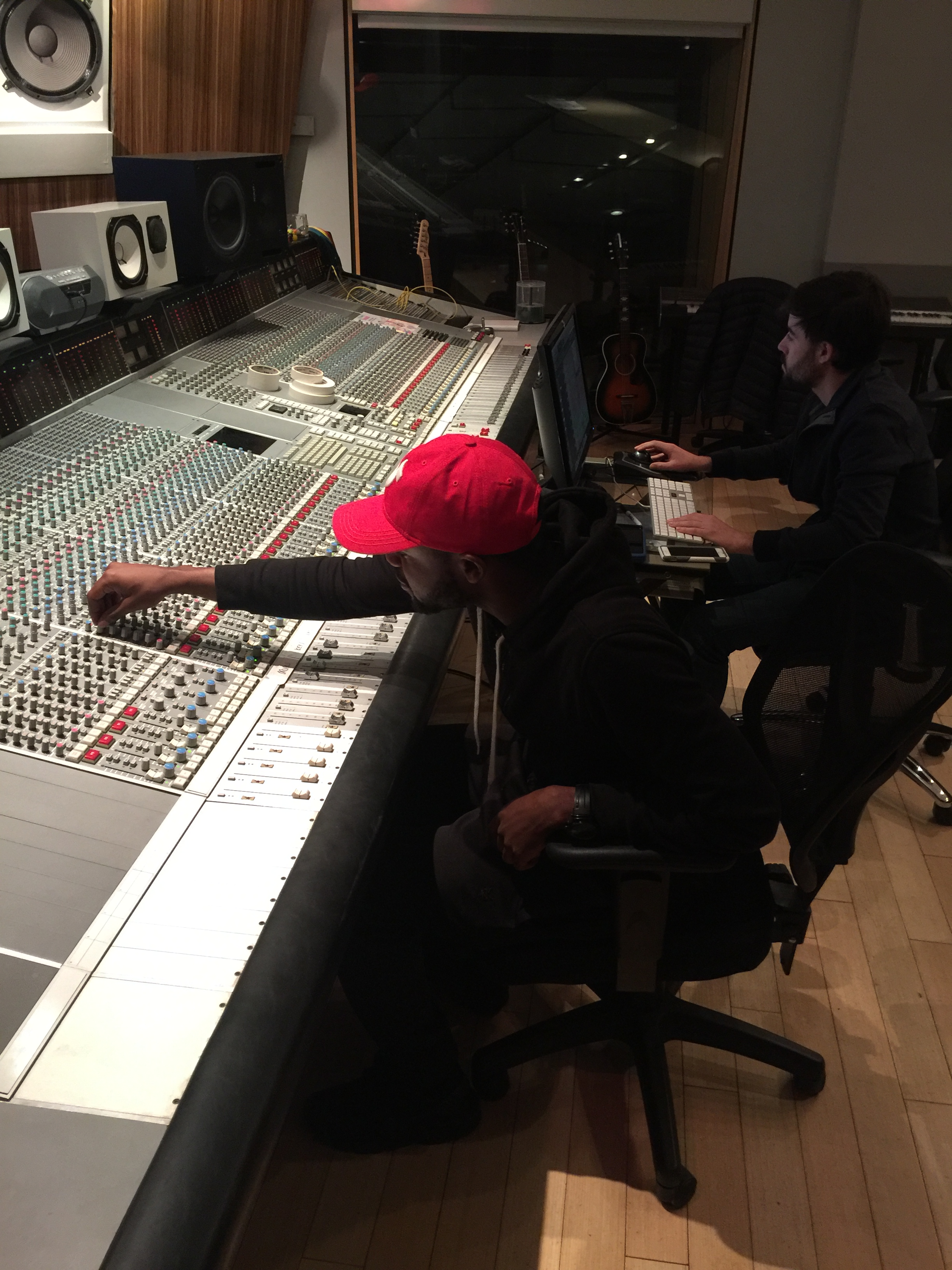
JayFrance in the studio during a mixing session.

JayFrance first started experimenting with music as a student at Hazelwood West High School. His first major production hit came with Atlantic recording artist Fetty Wap's "My Way" in 2015. It also featured rapper Drake on the remix. The song reached #7 on the Billboard Hot 100 and attained the widespread attention for the first time. Following its release to digital retailers, "My Way" jumped 80 positions from 87 to number 7, fueled by 152,000 first-week sales and 6.6 million domestic streams.

== Discography ==
=== Singles ===
List of singles as producer, with selected chart positions and certifications, showing year released, performing artists and album name
Title	Year	Peak chart positions						Certifications	Album
Title	Year	US	US R&B	US Rap	CAN	GER	UK	Certifications	Album
"Hell of a Night" (SchoolBoy Q)	2014	—	46	—	—	—	—		Oxymoron
"KK" (Wiz Khalifa featuring Project Pat and Juicy J)	2014	—	35	—	—	—	—		Blacc Hollywood
"Masterpiece (Mona Lisa)" (Jazmine Sullivan)	2015	—	—	—	—	—	—		Reality Show
"My Way" (Fetty Wap featuring Drake)	2015	7	5	1	31	—	80	RIAA: Platinum	Fetty Wap (album)
"My House" (Flo Rida)	2015	4	—	—	5	16	59	RIAA: 4× Platinum	My House (EP)

== Awards and nominations ==
Year	Award	Category	Result
2015	Grammy Awards	Best Rap Album (Wiz Khalifa - Blacc Hollywood)	Nominated
