= KK (song) =

Promotional single by Wiz Khalifa featuring Juicy J and Project Pat

from the album Blacc Hollywood
- Released: July 15, 2014
- Genre: Trap
- Length: 4:09
- Label: Rostrum; Atlantic
- Songwriters: Cameron Thomaz; James Scheffer; M. Mule; Niko Marzouca; Jordan Houston; Patrick Houston
- Producers: Jim Jonsin; Finatik N Zac; JayFrance

Wiz Khalifa chronology
"We Dem Boyz" (2014)	"KK" (2014)	"Shell Shocked" (2014)

Juicy J chronology
"Bounce It" (2014)	"KK" (2014)	"Shell Shocked" (2014)

Music video
- "KK" on YouTube

"KK" is a song by American rapper Wiz Khalifa featuring fellow American rappers Juicy J and Project Pat, from his fifth studio album Blacc Hollywood (2014). On July 15, 2014, it was released by Rostrum Records and Atlantic Records as the album's first promotional single. It was produced by Jim Jonsin, Finatik N Zac, and JayFrance (formerly known as Micah J Foxx).

== Music video ==
On July 15, 2014, the music video was released for "KK".

== Track listing ==
Digital download

1. "KK" (featuring Juicy J and Project Pat) - 4:09

== Chart performance ==
Chart (2014)	Peak position
US Bubbling Under Hot 100 (Billboard)	8
US Hot R&B/Hip-Hop Songs (Billboard)	35

== Certifications ==
Region	Certification	Certified units/sales
United States (RIAA)	Gold	500,000^{‡}
^{‡} Sales+streaming figures based on certification alone.
