= Oxymoron (Schoolboy Q album) =

Studio album by Schoolboy Q
- Released: February 25, 2014
- Recorded: June 2012 – 2013
- Studio: Clockwork (Van Nuys); Glenwood (Burbank); No Excuses (Santa Monica); Record Plant (Los Angeles)
- Genre: West Coast hip hop; hip hop; gangsta rap
- Length: 59:25
- Label: TDE; Interscope
- Producer: The Alchemist; DJ Dahi; Gwen Bunn; JayFrance; LordQuest; Marz; Mike Will Made It; Nez & Rio; Pharrell Williams; Sounwave; Swiff D; THC; Tyler, the Creator; Willie B.

Schoolboy Q chronology
Habits & Contradictions (2012)	Oxymoron (2014)	Blank Face LP (2016)

Deluxe edition cover

Singles from Oxymoron
- 1. "Collard Greens" Released: June 11, 2013; 2. "Man of the Year" Released: November 23, 2013; 3. "Studio" Released: April 22, 2014; 4. "Hell of a Night" Released: October 21, 2014

Oxymoron is the third studio album by American rapper Schoolboy Q. It was released on February 25, 2014, through Top Dawg Entertainment and distributed by Interscope Records. Oxymoron was his first album released under a major record label to music retailers, whereas his previous albums were released independently to digital retailers only.

Schoolboy Q enlisted collaborators such as Kendrick Lamar, 2 Chainz, ASAP Rocky, Jay Rock, Tyler, the Creator and Kurupt, among others. The album's production was handled by high-profile record producers such as Boi-1da, The Alchemist, Mike Will Made It, Clams Casino, Nez & Rio, DJ Dahi and Pharrell, as well as others, including members of Top Dawg Entertainment's in-house production teams Digi+Phonics and THC.

Oxymoron received generally positive reviews from critics, who praised its haunting production and Schoolboy Q's aggressive lyrics. The album was also a commercial success, debuting at number one on the US Billboard 200, selling 139,000 copies in its first week of release. It additionally peaked highly on the main album charts in Canada, New Zealand, Ireland, and the United Kingdom. The album received a nomination at the 2015 Grammy Awards for Best Rap Album.

The album was supported by four official singles: "Collard Greens", "Man of the Year", "Studio" and "Hell of a Night", as well as the promotional singles "Yay Yay" and "Break the Bank". To date, "Studio" is his highest-charting song as a lead artist peaking at number 38 on the US Billboard Hot 100 chart. Schoolboy Q also toured the United States and Europe on the Oxymoron World Tour, with Isaiah Rashad and Vince Staples.

== Background ==
In June 2012, Schoolboy Q revealed he had begun working on his major label debut, announcing that he would be the second member of Black Hippy, to release his commercial debut with Interscope Records, following Kendrick Lamar's Good Kid, M.A.A.D City. In a November 2012 interview, Schoolboy Q expressed: "Kendrick [Lamar] left me no choice but to drop a classic", referring to Lamar's album Good Kid, M.A.A.D City and its impact on his own respective major label debut. In the third part of that exclusive interview, Schoolboy Q revealed he would be releasing another project in 2012, preceding his major label debut, which was scheduled for an early 2013 release. The other project he was planning to release before the end of 2012 was set to be a mixtape, however in December 2012, Schoolboy Q tweeted he had changed his mind and was going to focus on his debut album.

== Development ==
It's better than Kendrick's album. My opinion doesn't fucking matter. Q's album is crazy. It's just filled with so much. I don't know, man. I think that Q made a better album than Kendrick. There is no such thing as a better album at the end of the day. They probably both are different. But I just wanted to say [that] because it creates more hype for [my] homie's album. But I really believe that. Or do I? Or am I just saying it? Do I believe anything I say? What is life?

— Schoolboy Q's friend and fellow American rapper Mac Miller, in an August 2013 interview with Hard Knock TV

In June 2013, Schoolboy Q said the album would chronicle gangsta rap and Crips history, stating the album is about: "L.A., the real L.A., raw and uncut, it's not the watered down L.A." Schoolboy Q voiced he grew up in the heart of Los Angeles and he wanted to "put the real heart of L.A. into music." In July, Schoolboy Q appeared on Bootleg Kev's radio show, where he revealed the project's overall theme, stating it is about his responsibilities as a father and the history of the notorious Los Angeles street gang Crips "from 1969 to present day."

In August 2013, Schoolboy Q called the album his "best work yet." He also called it a classic, but hoped his fans will have the final say: "It's a classic album I would like to say, but I would like the people to say it's a classic. But in my eyes it's a crazy album…I'm really proud of myself for this record." Schoolboy Q further commented on the album as he compared it to past releases including 2012's Habits & Contradictions and his independent debut, Setbacks. The rapper stated that the major difference between the three projects is that he wasn't forced to compromise on Oxymoron: "It's me. This album is really me. It's my life. Habits & Contradictions and Setbacks was more like—I compromised a little bit also with them projects. 'Hands on the Wheel' was like I really was like 'I'mma go to radio with this'…I made this project the way I wanted it to make. I wanted it to sound [right]. So, this album is crazy. It's my best work. I know a lot of rappers say that when they dropping they albums, but I'm one of those dudes it ain't like I drop mixtapes. It ain't like I do that type of stuff. Drop songs every month to let you know I'm really in the studio perfecting things." In addition to losing the need to compromise, Schoolboy Q hinted Oxymoron may boast a "more comfortable Q." While speaking exclusively with HipHopDX earlier in the year, the rapper shared a few words of advice for his fellow emcees as he touched on his increased comparability with music: "I feel like all rappers, the more comfortable you are, the better your raps are gon' be. When I was in the studios [before], I wrote the verse, and I wasn't comfortable, but I just did it anyway. The more comfortable you are with your music, the iller you gon' get. You feel confident and comfortable in your voice and find yourself." In September 2013, Schoolboy Q discussed how gang history would be included in his album: "I've never said this in an interview," Schoolboy Q said in an interview with Life+Times: "This album is about me taking care of my daughter and Crip history from 1969 to present."

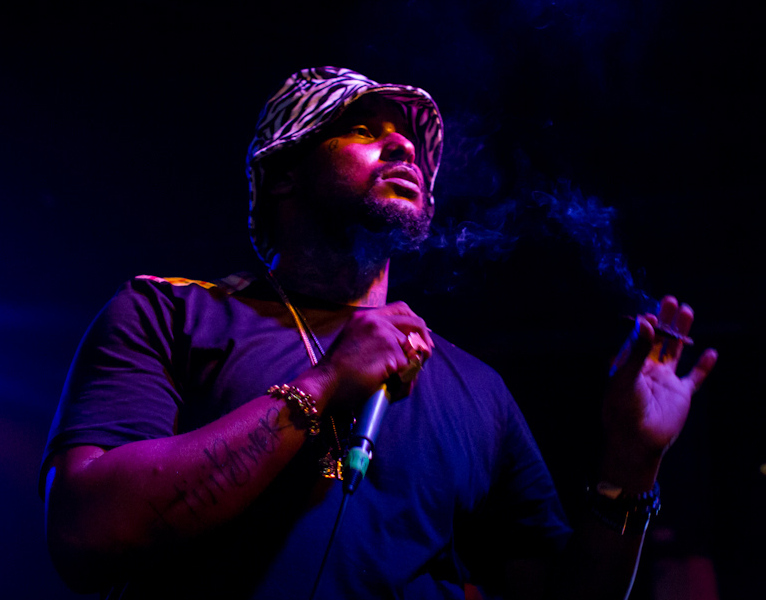
Oxymoron is Schoolboy Q's first album released on a major record label (Interscope Records).

In November 2013, Schoolboy Q expressed he felt there were no more gangsta rappers. In an interview, Schoolboy Q discussed his status as a gangsta rapper: "I'm not one of them rappers that's scared to put a title on their name," Schoolboy Q said during an interview with MTV. "Conscious rappers never like to be called conscious rappers and a lyrical rapper never like to be a party rapper. I'm a gangsta rapper, that's who I am. I happen to make fun records at the same time, that's what I do. I joke, I bag on niggas, my personality is like that, but I am a gangsta rapper and that's what I'm gonna bring to the table." During the interview, Schoolboy Q then added that gangsta rappers are nowhere to be found today: "There's no more gangsta rappers. It's just trap music now. So I wanna get that old feeling back that I do naturally. I'm not necessarily trying to bring gangsta rap back. I'm just trying to let you know it's still here and I'm a part of it. I feel like I'm the only one out of the coast that's doing this gangsta rap shit the way that it used to be done...how niggas used to put detail in their music, not just going to the club and turning up." Schoolboy Q said that he is going to bring that style in Oxymoron: "I'm just telling my story and what I grew up around and what I seen and what I did and I wanna put that in the light instead of everybody just smiling. Like Eminem said, 'Whatever happened to wildin' out and being violent? / Whatever happened to catchin a good-ol' fashioned passionate ass-whoopin' and getting your shoes coat and your hat tooken?' "I'm one of them niggas," Schoolboy Q continued. "Whatever happened to that? I don't want niggas to get beat up or no shit like that, but at the end of the day, that is a part of life and I like that type of music. That's what pushed West Coast music to where it was at like when Dre, Snoop and all them...Dogg Pound. That's what they was doin' and that's what they was talking about and that's what I was raised off of."

== Title and artwork ==
On December 12, 2012, after multiple hints and hashtags with the word "oxymoron", via his Twitter Schoolboy Q wrote: "OXYMORON '13", confirming his major label debut's title. In March 2013, on Power 105.1's The Breakfast Club, Schoolboy Q revealed the album's title stems from his past as a drug dealer selling OxyContin, and his desire to follow the concept of his last album Habits & Contradictions (2012).

On January 22, 2014, in an interview with New York-radio station Hot 97, Schoolboy Q explained the "oxymoron" his album title refers to, "The oxymoron in this album is that I'm doing all this bad to do good for my daughter. That's why I'm robbin'. That's why I'm stealin'.....Whatever it is that I'm talking about in my album [that's] negative, it's always for a good cause, for my daughter." That is why he chose to feature his daughter Joy, on the standard edition of the album cover. That month, Schoolboy Q revealed to DJ Whoo Kid that Oxymoron being the representation of the bad things he does to take care of his daughter, who is pictured on the cover scowling, all the while depicting innocence.

== Recording and production ==
Schoolboy Q had initially announced guest appearances on the album to include Kendrick Lamar, Ab-Soul, Jay Rock, ASAP Rocky, Danny Brown, and Action Bronson, while the production would be handled by in-house producers from Top Dawg Entertainment, such as Digi+Phonics members Sounwave and Tae Beast. In December 2012, Schoolboy Q revealed his collaboration with fellow American rapper Danny Brown, to be titled "Eat." However Schoolboy Q later revealed the song would not appear on the album. In a February 2013 interview, Schoolboy Q said he was "like four records away from being done". During the same interview he claimed the making of the album was "stressful and fun at the same time". He also stated there was a point in the recording process where he was stuck because he "couldn't find the right beats." In March 2013, he would later say: "I stopped recording for about two months to gather my thoughts and see how I was gonna attack the album. At first I was going a little too party. Then I started going too story. I was almost trying to make an album like Kendrick's. You try so many things. Now, I've finally got the right perfect mixture."

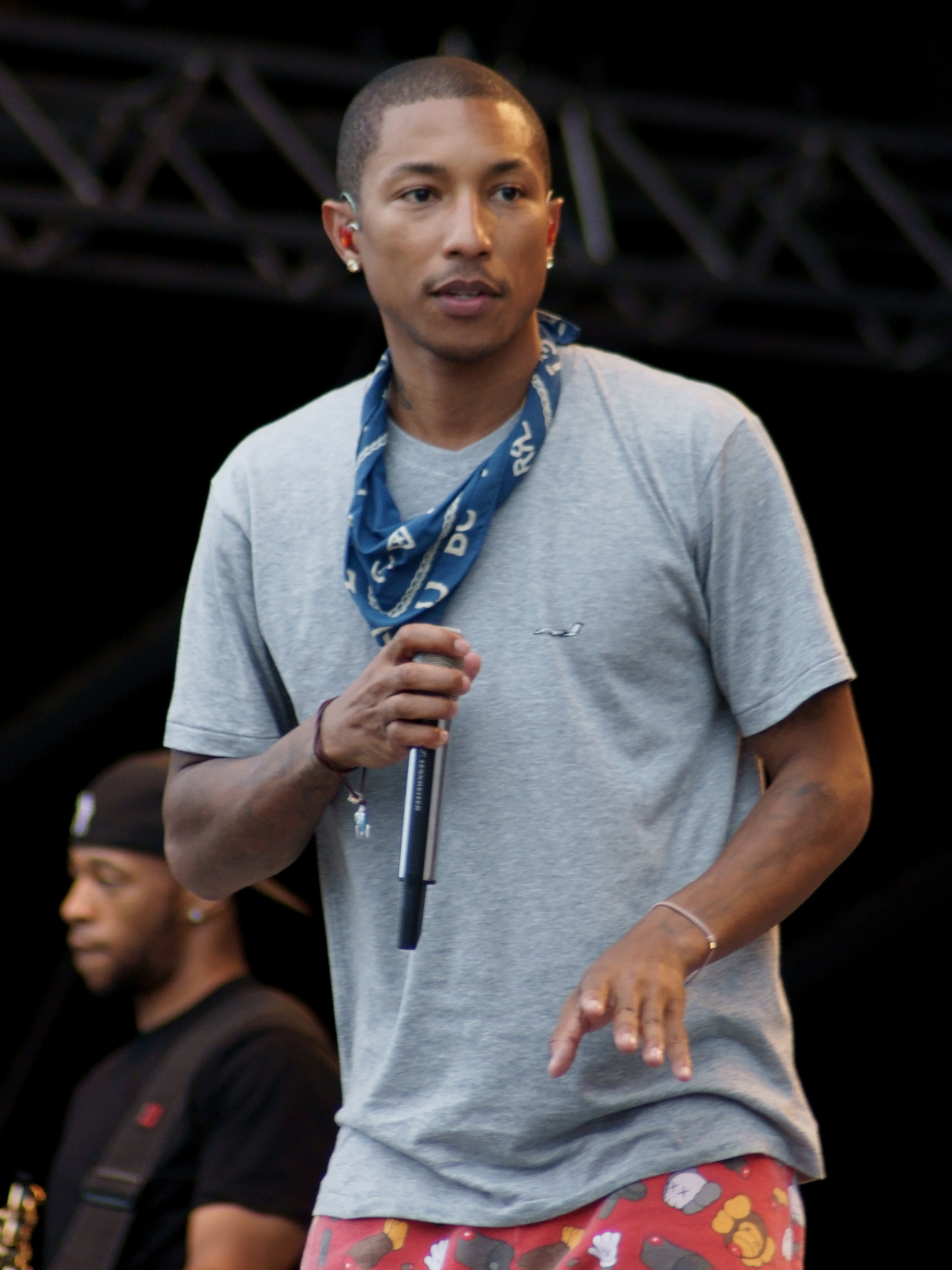
Pharrell Williams produced the album's second track, "Los Awesome", a collaboration with Black Hippy member Jay Rock.

When speaking on the album's features in March 2013, Schoolboy Q told MTV, "I just kept it real in house with my homies. This my first album; it's real special to me. I don't wanna be messing with this dude, with this dude, this dude. It's all in house, it's the same Q. Like the fans, I'mma give 'em what they want." In March 2013, Schoolboy Q once again stated the album was four songs away from being completed. That month, Schoolboy Q revealed to Vibe that he decided to continue his "Druggy's wit Hoes" song series, for the album. He revealed it's one of the easier songs for him to do, as it comes natural: "I go to the studio, get faded, said, 'Cuh Soul, I got Druggy Wit Hoes Part 3,' and he said, 'I'm on my way.' I think he was off acid that night too. Yeah, I think he did his verse off acid [Laughs]." In April 2013, he stated he had been in the studio with American record producers David Banner and Pharrell Williams.

On May 11, 2013, Schoolboy Q announced on Twitter that the "album is done" and that he was "waitin for Joy to come put da finisHing toucH." On May 13, 2013, Schoolboy Q revealed on Twitter, that Chicago-based production duo Nez & Rio, who previously handled production on his 2011 effort Habits & Contradictions, are "all [over] Oxymoron." In June 2013, Schoolboy Q said his daughter Joy would have various speaking parts throughout the album and revealed hopes of having fellow American gangsta rapper 50 Cent, provide the intro for the album. On July 3, 2013, Schoolboy Q tweeted he had finished his second music video from the album, for a song titled "Break the Bank", revealing the song was produced by The Alchemist.

In July 2013, Schoolboy Q revealed that fellow American rapper J. Cole had provided production for the album and that Wu-Tang Clan member Raekwon would appear as a featured guest on the album. In July 2013, Schoolboy Q stated he was so focused on recording the album that he wasn't eating or sleeping right at times. He also revealed his collaboration with ASAP Rocky is titled "Californication." On August 20, 2013, American record producer Flying Lotus previewed three untitled songs which he had produced and recorded with Schoolboy Q. On September 24, 2013, Schoolboy Q revealed that Snoop Dogg would also appear on the album.

In December 2013, at radio station Power 106's Cali Christmas event, in which Schoolboy Q performed, he revealed the album would feature appearances from a couple of old-school gangsta rappers and that he had removed other features to ensure the album had a consistent old-school feel. He later proved this when he announced West Coast gangsta rapper Suga Free, would appear on "Grooveline Pt. 2". During a January 2014 Ask Me Anything session on Reddit, Schoolboy Q confirmed that fellow rappers 2 Chainz and Tyler, the Creator, would be featured on the album, as well as production from Clams Casino.

In a January 2014 interview with New York radio station Hot 97, Schoolboy Q talked about the album's delay and how Kendrick Lamar's rise has affected him: "It's finally done. He's [Kendrick Lamar] the reason why I took so long on my album. If it was up to Interscope, mine would've been out last summer; 2013... But I wanted to perfect my stuff, because I didn't think it was wrapped. I always felt like it was missing three records. Even when I was done with the album, like a lot of these songs that I have on this album was made in 2012. I spent the whole 2013 trying to find four to three records that fit the album, that took my album to that level." During the same interview, Schoolboy Q compared the album to Snoop Dogg's debut album Doggystyle; he also admitted he analyzed Kendrick Lamar's Good Kid, M.A.A.D City album as he crafted his own work: "Yes, I studied Kendrick, because he is one of the heavy hitters in the game."

== Music and lyrics ==
At a February 2014 listening session for the album, Schoolboy Q spoke on the album's opening track: "When I first made ['Gangsta'] all I wanted to say was that my grandma showed me my first strap. That's all I wanted to put in the song. I just thought that was so gangsta. It was kind of weird, too, now that I really think about it. She used to take her bullets out of the gun and leave the clip in her room and let me play with her gun. I was an only child so I probably got on her nerves that much that she finally gave me her burner, like, 'Here, get the fuck out my face.' [Laughs] I just wanted to say that so bad." He also added on how he incorporated one of his neighborhood friends on to the record: "[I was also able to] speak on my homeboy Rat Tone. He's one of my big homies from my hood. He showed me my first [AK-47] when I was like 11-years-old. I was amazed by it. I thought that shit was tight. They used to have all the shiny shit. That's how we talked. We would call a gun 'fly.' Like, 'Your dickies is cut super perfect and they got the right amount of dirt on them. That shit is fly."

During the same listening session, Schoolboy Q spoke on the Pharrell-produced "Los Awesome", which features his TDE label-mate Jay Rock: "['Los Awesome' featuring Jay Rock] is gangsta shit. It ain't one of them melodic muthafuckas like you about to fall in love. This some gang bangin' shit. He also expressed he felt the track was necessary for the album: "I needed to get that one out the way on my album. I needed something that the gang bangers could identify with. Not so much my core fans, more so the gang members."

In February 2014, during a Q&A session for the album, at SONOS Studios in Los Angeles, California, Schoolboy Q described the song "Prescription/Oxymoron", as the most personal: "I came up selling OxyContin," he said. "The karma behind it was that I never took an OxyContin before but I did get addicted to Percocets, Xanax, Codeine—shit like that. When my daughter was one and two [years old], I used to get into sleep comas, like 'Xan comas'—just dead to the world and I put it into the music." Schoolboy Q said he arranged the song to juxtapose the process of selling prescription pills and addiction: "I put the OxyContin and selling it at the end of the relapse or the addiction," he said. "I sold OxyContin and then I got addicted [to pills]. This way, I showed that I got addicted then I sold it. That was a crazy record. That's true shit—the first part of it when my daughter tried to wake me up and I was dead to the world. That was my little secret. I always had the cup with me. They just never knew I had a gang of pills in the other bottle. That was a little story about me and how I was addicted, too."

== Release and promotion ==
In 2012, from September to November, Schoolboy Q appeared alongside Danny Brown and ASAP Mob as supporting acts for ASAP Rocky's 40-date national Long. Live. ASAP Tour. Also Schoolboy Q toured with rappers Wiz Khalifa, Mac Miller and Kendrick Lamar on the Under The Influence Tour. The album was included on many "Most Anticipated Albums of 2013" lists including fourth by the New York Press, sixteenth by Complex and the seventeenth by XXL. In a March 21, 2013 interview Q stated the album would be released in a couple months. While Schoolboy Q remained quiet about the release date, Kendrick Lamar had stated the album would be released in the Northern Hemisphere's summer of 2013. On March 24, 2013 a song titled "Hell of a Night" by Schoolboy Q, was premiered on the NBA's Bacardi Highlight mix on TNT. The song was later leaked online, however Schoolboy Q stated it was an unfinished version.

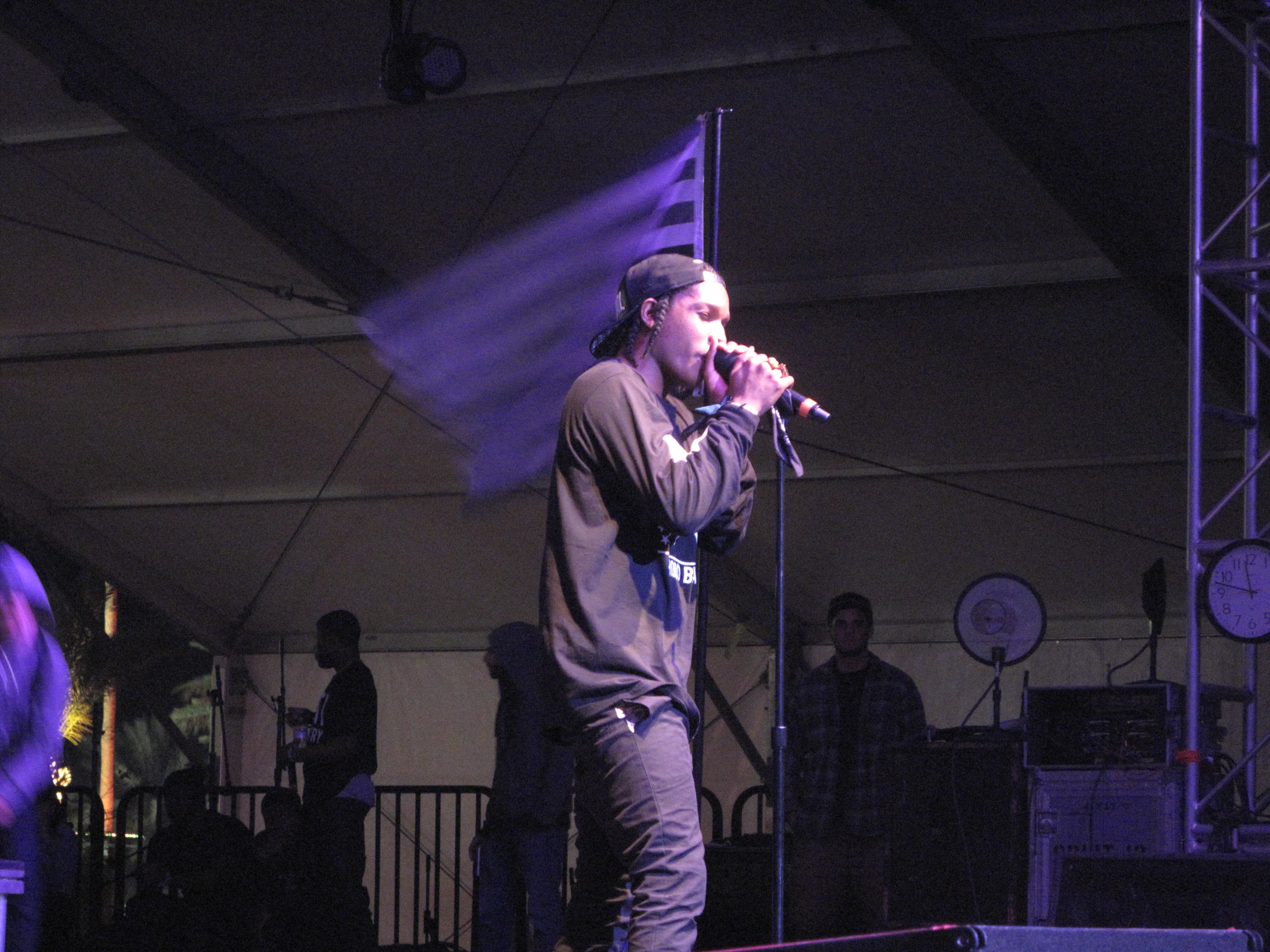
Schoolboy Q toured with ASAP Rocky (pictured) and featured him on the deluxe edition song "Californication".

On August 8, 2013, Schoolboy Q told MTV's RapFix that he is waiting on a few samples to clear before announcing a release date for the album. One of the main issues being a sample for "Druggy's wit Hoes, Pt. Trois", featuring Ab-Soul. In January 2014, during his Reddit Ask Me Anything session, he confirmed the song did not make the album due to the sample clearance issue. On September 19, 2013, Schoolboy Q confirmed that he had officially completed the album and turned it in to Top Dawg Entertainment for mixing and mastering. However, the following day Top Dawg Entertainment CEO Anthony "Top Dawg" Tiffith, revealed on Twitter that no release date will be divulged until "a few more samples" can be successfully cleared. He also confirmed a new song would be released "early next week," as a token of appreciation for fans' patience and loyalty. As promised, on September 25, 2013, a new song by Schoolboy Q, titled "Banger (Moshpit)," was premiered via the label's SoundCloud page. On October 25, 2013 the music video for "Banger (Moshpit)," was released via the label's YouTube account.

During his verse on the official remix to his TDE label-mate Isaiah Rashad's song "Shot U Down", Schoolboy Q revealed the album had been pushed from a November 2013 release, until January 2014. In an October 2013 interview, TDE's co-president Terrence "Punch" Henderson shared insight on Schoolboy Q's debut album. When asked what's in the immediate future for TDE, Punch responded "You're definitely gonna see Schoolboy [Q]'s album. That's coming soon. We're probably about 90% done with it." He added that there was a possibility it could still be released in 2013: "Possibly. It's a few sample issues and technical stuff that we gotta get the kinks out of." In November 2013, Schoolboy Q performed the singles "Man of the Year", "Yay Yay" and "Collard Greens", for a private audience at Power 98.3's Studio Sessions in Phoenix, Arizona. Q also sat down with Dee from Power 98.3, to talk about Kendrick Lamar's GQ cover story controversy, the release date for Oxymoron, and more.

On December 11, 2013, Top Dawg Entertainment released a video via their official YouTube account, announcing the release date for Oxymoron. The video features Schoolboy Q frustrated with the album's release date and with the help of his daughter Joy, he revealed the album would be released on February 25, 2014. On January 11, 2014, Schoolboy Q held an Ask Me Anything session on Reddit, answering questions such as if there's plans for an Oxymoron tour in the future, to which he responded: "Yupp dates should be up by end of tHa montH, but u know I like pusHing sHIt back so just wait lol." He also answered how much better he thinks Oxymoron is compared to his previous effort Habits & Contradictions, to which he replied: "A lot Habits [& Contradictions] is [just] good to me not classic." When asked on when he will reveal the full track list and artwork for the album, Schoolboy Q proclaimed: "[In a] few days."

On January 20, 2014, Schoolboy Q unveiled the official album artwork for the standard and deluxe versions of the album. Eight days later, Schoolboy Q announced an international concert tour supporting Oxymoron. The tour took place from March 1 to June 1, 2014, in North America and Europe. The tour featured fellow American rappers Isaiah Rashad and Vince Staples as supporting acts. On March 6, 2014, the music video was released for "What They Want" featuring 2 Chainz.

== Singles ==
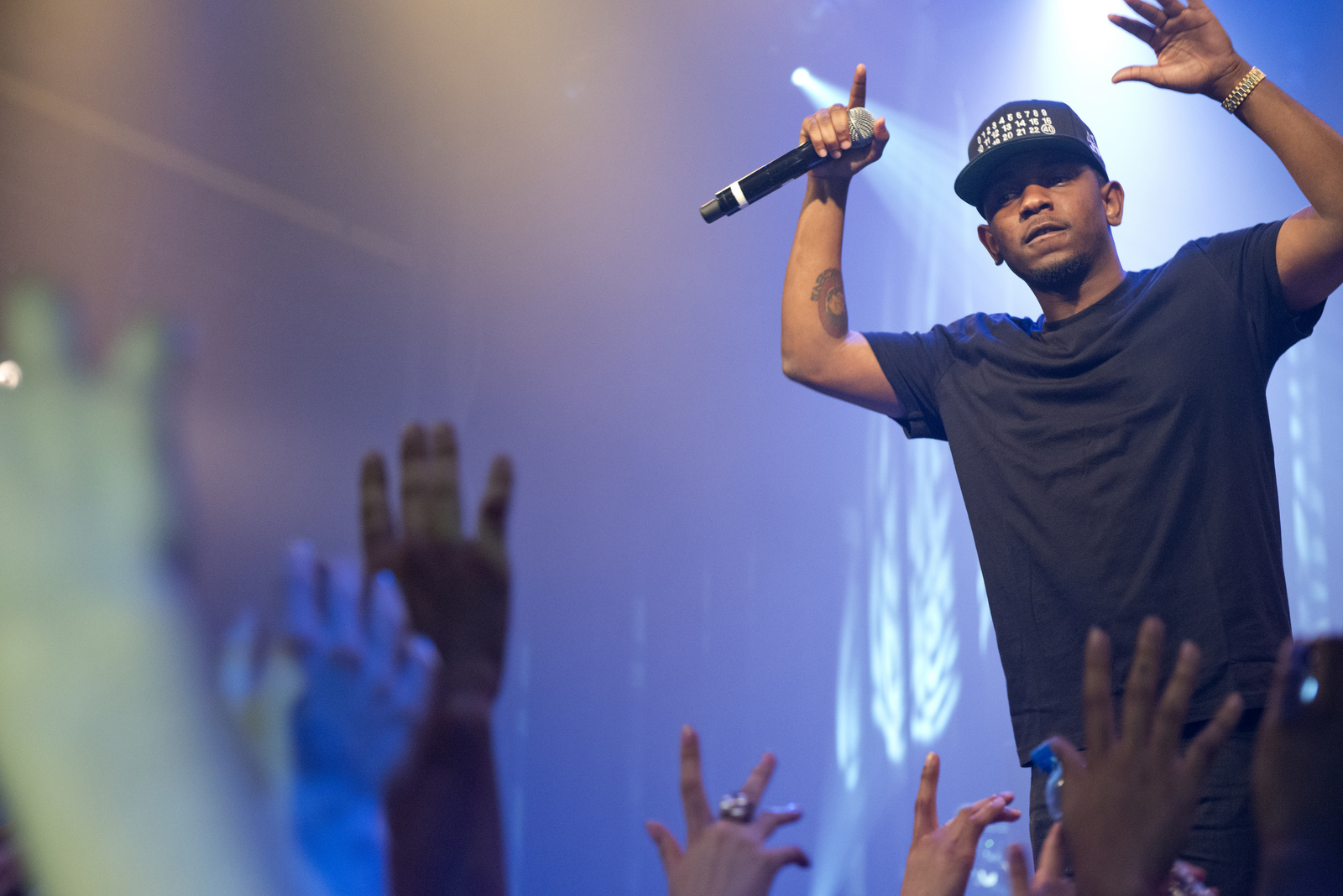
Black Hippy cohort Kendrick Lamar makes an appearance on the album's lead single "Collard Greens".

Schoolboy Q premiered "Yay Yay", as the first song to be released from Oxymoron on March 22, 2013, which was produced by Canadian record producer Boi-1da. The song was described by Schoolboy Q as a "coming of age drug tale." On April 16, 2013 "Yay Yay" was released as a digital download as the album's first promotional single. In a March interview with Vibe, after the interviewer referred to the song as the album's first single, Schoolboy Q stated "["Yay Yay"] is not a single, but it's a record we put out there." It was conclusively deemed a buzz single. In April, Schoolboy Q announced that an official remix of the song would be released featuring American trap rapper Jeezy. However, in August 2013, he would later tell MTV that the remix had not come together and would not be released. Ultimately, "Yay Yay" was included as a bonus track on the iTunes deluxe edition of the album.

Top Dawg Entertainment and Interscope Records released a song, titled "Collard Greens", as the album's lead single, through digital distribution on June 11, 2013. The song, which features a guest verse from Schoolboy Q's label-mate and Black Hippy cohort Kendrick Lamar, was produced by American production team THC, alongside Gwen Bunn. On August 7, 2013, Schoolboy Q appeared on BET's 106 & Park, to premiere the music video for "Collard Greens". The music video was directed by JDDC and features a cameo appearance from American rapper Macklemore. The song has since peaked at number 92 on the US Billboard Hot 100.

On May 13, 2013, Top Dawg Entertainment released the music video for Kendrick Lamar's single, "Bitch, Don't Kill My Vibe". Later that day, the director's cut of the video was released, which included a bonus clip featuring a snippet of a new unreleased song by Schoolboy Q. American hip hop producers Nez & Rio, who previously collaborated with Schoolboy Q on "Druggys wit Hoes Again" and "Niggahs.already.know.davers.flow", soon revealed they had produced the new song. The song, titled "Man of the Year", first appeared on the soundtrack to the 2013 video game NBA Live 14. "Man of the Year" was later released as the second single on November 23, 2013, through digital distribution. The song is also known for sampling "Cherry", as performed by American electronic band Chromatics, from the 2013 compilation album After Dark 2. On January 17, 2014, the music video for "Man of the Year", which was directed by Dave Free, Fredo Tovar and Scott Fleishman, was released.

On January 21, 2014, Schoolboy Q released the Alchemist-produced track, "Break the Bank", as the second promotional single from the album. The song was recorded in 2012 around the release of Kendrick Lamar's Good Kid, M.A.A.D City, being one of the older records featured on the album he raps: "Tell Kendrick move from the throne, I came for it," referencing Lamar's recent rise to superstardom. On February 21, 2014, the music video was released for "Break the Bank".

On February 26, 2014, Schoolboy Q performed "Studio", with special guest BJ the Chicago Kid, on late-night talk show Conan. He later performed the song, once again alongside BJ the Chicago Kid, on April 4, 2014, during Jimmy Kimmel Live!. "Studio" impacted urban contemporary radio in the United States on April 22, 2014 as the third single from Oxymoron. That same day, the song's music video was released.

On October 21, 2014, "Hell of a Night" was serviced to urban radio as the fourth official single. The song had previously leaked in May 2013 during the NBA finals prior to being released.

== Critical reception ==
Professional ratings
Aggregate scores
Source	Rating
AnyDecentMusic?	7.3/10
Metacritic	78/100
Review scores
Source	Rating
AllMusic	3.5/5 stars
The A.V. Club	B
Billboard	4/5 stars
The Guardian	3/5 stars
The Irish Times	4/5 stars
Los Angeles Times	3.5/4 stars
Pitchfork	7.8/10
Rolling Stone	4/5 stars
Spin	7/10
XXL	4/5

Oxymoron was met with generally positive reviews. At Metacritic, which assigns a normalized rating out of 100 to reviews from mainstream publications, the album received an average score of 78, based on 31 reviews. Aggregator AnyDecentMusic? gave it 7.3 out of 10, based on their assessment of the critical consensus.

Randall Roberts writing for the Los Angeles Times stated, "This is not an album to give your teenage kid without a companion conversation about the dangers of drugs. But after the disclaimer, sit down and wonder on the miraculous ways in which musical talent can germinate amid such a landscape and grow to create work filled with boundless promise." Michael Madden of Consequence said, "The moral of Oxymoron, though, is that Q couldn't have made a much better album being the rapper he is. It deserves the term "rap opera" more than most "rock operas" deserve theirs. It's something special, just like it was always planned to be." Christopher R. Weingarten of Rolling Stone said, "It helps that his voice is simply elastic – reminiscent at times of everything from Pusha T's steely grimace to T.I.'s effortless assonance to Eminem's giddy singsong: a finessed tool consistently going "hamhock" on some of the hardest beats this side of Illmatic. A not-as-good-kid traversing the same m.A.A.d. city as Kendrick, Schoolboy complements Lamar's narrative distance with evocative, unflinching first-person dispatches from the front lines." Luke Fox of Exclaim! stated, "Anticipation was already high upon hearing the quality of pre-released bangers "Man of the Year", "Break the Bank" and "Collard Green", but it's the album cuts that make Oxymoron – a double-entre nod to the former Oxycontin dealer and current No. 1 dad's paradoxical lifestyle – an early favourite for Top 10 of 2014."

Eric Diep of XXL said, "Oxymoron fits as another chapter in Q's journey for rap supremacy. It's hard to tell if Q will take Kendrick's throne off this debut, but you'd be hard-pressed to find anyone who hasn't already thought about it. The LP ends with "Fuck LA", an outro that embodies both his appeal and potential to be an even bigger threat in rap." David Amidon of PopMatters said, "Unlike his previous efforts Oxymoron picks a brand of momentum and sticks to it, avoiding the peaks and surprises that have so often signified a ScHoolboy Q project. But once the songs open up, once the mind begins latching onto whatever phrases happen to stand out from track to track alongside the larger personal narrative and getting lost in the blunted haze provided by Mike Will, Sounwave, Alchemist and Nez & Rio among others, it's hard to remain as aloof as initial impressions might feel." Omar Burgess of HipHopDX stated, "Ultimately the good moments are on par with what will be considered 2014's high-water marks, and if held they weren't held to the high standards of Setbacks and Habits & Contradictions, Q's low points would be acceptable from another rapper. Given TDE's ever-increasing appeal, Oxymoron isn't quite an elite offering, but it meets the difficult task of attracting casual fans without straying too far from the formula that attracted ScHoolboy Q's core audience." David Jeffries of AllMusic said, "The wonders never cease on this adventurous and street-tough effort, but they never sort themselves well, either, and with accessible highlights like "Blind Threats," "Break the Bank", and "Man of the Year" all bundled toward the end, this LP requires a surprising amount of patience, especially for an album with "featuring 2 Chainz" on its track list."

=== Rankings ===
Complex named it the sixth best album of the first-half of 2014. Writing for them, Justin Charity said, "ScHoolboy gave us a tape full of dope beats and aggressive rhymes. He's often growling, often haunting, like Freeway in his Roc-A-Fella prime. "Man of the Year" and "Break the Bank" are the obvious arena-pleasers, and they're obviously successful as such, but Oxymoron leads with Q's funkier foot. Featuring West Coast brethren Kurupt and Tyler The Creator, "The Purge" is, literally, a fire engine melody. Oxymoron is grim, and it's gangsta, without once forgetting to have fun. Ab-Soul's album is out next week. Q reset the bar. Oh, it's high all right."

=== Industry awards ===
Awards and nominations for Oxymoron
Year	Ceremony	Category	Result	Ref.
2014	BET Hip Hop Awards	Album of the Year	Nominated	
2015	Grammy Awards	Best Rap Album	Nominated	

== Commercial performance ==
Oxymoron debuted at number one on the US Billboard 200, with first-week sales of 139,000 copies in the United States. In its second week, the album dropped to number eight on the chart, selling 30,000 more copies according to Nielsen SoundScan. In its third week, the album dropped to number 15 on the chart, selling 16,000 more copies. In its fourth week, the album dropped to number 29 on the chart, selling 12,000 more copies bringing its total album sales to 198,000. As of June 2016, the album has sold 415,000 copies in the United States. On July 17, 2025, the album was certified double platinum for combined sales and album-equivalent units of over two million units in the United States.

== Track listing ==
Oxymoron track listing
No.	Title	Writer(s)	Producer(s)	Length
1.	"Gangsta"	Quincy Hanley; Nesbitt Wesonga, Jr.; Mario Loving; Alan Bergman; Marilyn Bergman; Michel Legrand	Nez & Rio; Sounwave^{[b]}	3:51
2.	"Los Awesome" (featuring Jay Rock)	Hanley; Johnny McKinzie; Pharrell Williams	Pharrell	4:12
3.	"Collard Greens" (featuring Kendrick Lamar)	Hanley; Kendrick Duckworth; Axel Morgan; Ricci Riera; Gwen Bunn	THC; Bunn^{[a]}	4:59
4.	"What They Want" (featuring 2 Chainz)	Hanley; Tauheed Epps; Michael Williams; Marquel Middlebrooks	Mike Will Made It; Marz^{[a]}	4:27
5.	"Hoover Street"	Hanley; Mark Spears	Sounwave	6:36
6.	"Studio" (featuring BJ the Chicago Kid)	Hanley; Bryan Sledge; Steve Thornton	Swiff D	4:38
7.	"Prescription / Oxymoron"	Hanley; Spears; Willie Brown	Sounwave; Willie B.	7:09
8.	"The Purge" (featuring Tyler, the Creator and Kurupt)	Hanley; Tyler Okonma; Ricardo Brown; Paul Salva	Tyler, the Creator	4:54
9.	"Blind Threats" (featuring Raekwon)	Hanley; Corey Woods; Jeffrey Nuamah; Gil Evans	LordQuest; Sounwave^{[b]}	4:29
10.	"Hell of a Night"	Hanley; Dacoury Natche	DJ Dahi; JayFrance^{[a]}	4:32
11.	"Break the Bank"	Hanley; Alan Maman; Phil Ryan	The Alchemist	5:54
12.	"Man of the Year"	Hanley; Wesonga, Jr.; Loving; Ruth Radelet; Adam Miller; Nat Walker; John Padgett	Nez & Rio; Sounwave^{[b]}	3:36
Total length:				59:25

Deluxe edition
No.	Title	Writer(s)	Producer(s)	Length
13.	"His & Her Fiend" (featuring SZA)	Hanley; Lance Howard; Solana Rowe	Rocket	2:55
14.	"Grooveline Pt. 2" (featuring Suga Free)	Hanley; Dejuan Rice; Donte Perkins	Tae Beast; Frank Dukes^{[a]}	4:18
15.	"Fuck LA"	Hanley; Wesonga, Jr.; Loving	Nez & Rio	3:20
Total length:				69:58

iTunes deluxe edition (bonus tracks)
No.	Title	Writer(s)	Producer(s)	Length
16.	"Gravy"	Hanley; Mike Volpe; Stephen Bruner; Chris Dave	Clams Casino	2:26
17.	"Yay Yay"	Hanley; Matthew Samuels; Zale Epstein; Brett Krueger	Boi-1da; The Maven Boys^{[a]}	4:31
Total length:				76:53

Target deluxe edition (bonus tracks)
No.	Title	Writer(s)	Producer(s)	Length
16.	"Pusha Man"	Hanley; Perkins; Valle	Tae Beast	1:43
17.	"Californication" (featuring ASAP Rocky)	Hanley; Wesonga, Jr.; Loving; Rakim Mayers	Nez & Rio	6:17
Total length:				77:58

Notes

- ^{^[a]} signifies a co-producer
- ^{^[b]} signifies an additional producer

Sample credits

- "Gangsta" contains a sample of "Windmills of Your Mind", written by Michel Legrand and Alan Bergman.
- "Prescription / Oxymoron" contains a sample of "Undenied", performed by Portishead.
- "Blind Threats" contains a sample of "Las Vegas Tango", performed by Gary Burton.
- "Break the Bank" contains a sample of "Something is Happening", performed by Man.
- "Man of the Year" contains a sample of "Cherry", performed by Chromatics.

== Personnel ==
Credits for Oxymoron adapted from AllMusic.

- 2 Chainz – featured artist
- The Alchemist – producer
- Nathaniel Alford – engineer
- Derek "MixedByAli" Ali – mixing
- Willie B. – producer
- Jazmine Bailey – vocals
- BJ the Chicago Kid – featured artist
- Mike Bozzi – mastering
- Stephen Bruner – bass
- Gwen Bunn – producer
- Charly and Margaux – string arrangements, strings
- Andrew Coleman – engineer
- Hector Delgado – engineer
- DJ Dahi – producer
- Dave Free – art direction, associate producer
- Terrence Henderson – associate producer
- James Hunt – assistant, engineer
- Jaycen Joshua – mixing
- Kurupt – featured artist
- Kendrick Lamar – featured artist
- Marz – producer
- Mike Will Made It – producer
- Nez & Rio – producer
- Chris Parsons – videography
- Lord Quest – producer
- Raekwon – featured artist
- Renata Raksha – photography
- Robert Reyes – project coordinator
- Gee Bizzy Rightnow – engineer
- Jay Rock – featured artist
- Matt Schaeffer – guitar
- Schoolboy Q – art direction, primary artist
- Vlad Sepetov – graphic design
- Sounwave – producer
- Swiff D – producer
- THC Productions – producer
- Anthony "Top Dawg" Tiffith – executive producer
- Tyler, the Creator – featured artist, producer
- Andrew Van Meter – production coordination
- Pharrell Williams – producer

== Charts ==
=== Weekly charts ===
Chart performance for Oxymoron
Chart (2014)	Peak position
Australian Albums (ARIA)	11
Belgian Albums (Ultratop Flanders)	49
Belgian Albums (Ultratop Wallonia)	68
Canadian Albums (Billboard)	1
Danish Albums (Hitlisten)	23
Dutch Albums (Album Top 100)	68
French Albums (SNEP)	123
German Albums (Offizielle Top 100)	59
Irish Albums (IRMA)	33
New Zealand Albums (RMNZ)	7
Norwegian Albums (VG-lista)	28
Swiss Albums (Schweizer Hitparade)	24
UK Albums (OCC)	23
UK R&B Albums (OCC)	4
US Billboard 200	1
US Top R&B/Hip-Hop Albums (Billboard)	1

=== Year-end charts ===
2014 year-end chart performance for Oxymoron
Chart (2014)	Position
US Billboard 200	49
US Top R&B/Hip-Hop Albums (Billboard)	12

2015 year-end chart performance for Oxymoron
Chart (2015)	Position
US Top R&B/Hip-Hop Albums (Billboard)	76

== Certifications ==
Certifications for Oxymoron
Region	Certification	Certified units/sales
Denmark (IFPI Danmark)	Gold	10,000^{‡}
United Kingdom (BPI)	Silver	60,000^{‡}
United States (RIAA)	2× Platinum	2,000,000^{‡}
^{‡} Sales+streaming figures based on certification alone.

== See also ==
- List of Billboard 200 number-one albums of 2014
- List of Billboard number-one R&B/hip-hop albums of 2014
- List of number-one albums of 2014 (Canada)
