= Man of the Year (Schoolboy Q song) =

Single by Schoolboy Q

from the album Oxymoron
- Released: November 23, 2013
- Recorded: 2013
- Genre: Hip hop; trap
- Length: 3:36
- Label: TDE; Interscope
- Songwriters: Quincy Hanley; Nesbitt Wesonga; Mario Loving; Ruth Radelet; Adam Miller; Nat Walker; John Padgett
- Producers: Nez & Rio; Sounwave of Digi+Phonics (add.)

Schoolboy Q singles chronology
"White Walls" (2013)	"Man of the Year" (2013)	"Break the Bank" (2014)

Music video
- "Man of the Year" on YouTube

"Man of the Year" is a song by American hip hop recording artist Schoolboy Q. The song was released as the second official single from his major-label debut album Oxymoron, on November 23, 2013, by Top Dawg Entertainment (TDE) and Interscope Records. The song, produced by frequent collaborators Nez & Rio, first appeared on the soundtrack to the 2013 video game NBA Live 14. The song samples "Cherry", as performed by American electronic band Chromatics, from the 2013 compilation album After Dark 2. The song debuted at number 81 and later peaked at 62 on the US Billboard Hot 100.

== Background and release ==
On May 13, 2013, the music video for Top Dawg label-mate Kendrick Lamar's single "Bitch, Don't Kill My Vibe", was released. Later that day, the director's cut of the video was released, which included a bonus clip featuring a snippet of a new song by Schoolboy Q. Shortly after the video was released, American production duo Nez & Rio, who previously contributed production on Schoolboy Q's 2012 project Habits & Contradictions, revealed on Twitter that they had also produced the song at the end of the video. Also in May, Schoolboy Q tweeted: "Nez & rio all ova #OXYMORON" On November 5, 2013, it was revealed Schoolboy Q would appear on the soundtrack to the 2013 video game NBA Live 14.

"Man of the Year" was released as a single via digital distribution on November 23, 2013. On January 28, 2014, "Man of the Year" was serviced to rhythmic contemporary radio in the United States.

== Critical reception ==
"Man of the Year" was met with generally positive reviews from music critics. Brandon Soderberg of Spin called it one of the album's highlights. David Jeffries of AllMusic said it is an accessible highlight of the album. Lizzie Plaugic of CMJ referred to the song as one of the album's essential tracks. Craig Jenkins of Pitchfork Media said the song, "follows suit in affixing the happy ending to Oxymoron’s war stories while serving up the album’s most memorable hooks." Michael Madden of Consequence of Sound said it had one of the album's standout productions. Jason Lipshutz of Billboard said, ""Man of the Year" is not a lyrical masterpiece, but it slays: with a beat from Nez & Rio that nicks an obscure Chromatics track, the track explodes every time Q spits the refrain "Man of the year, ma-man of the BOUNCE," which is nonsensical but feels oh so right." Maya Kalev of Fact praised the endlessly catchy refrain of the song.

Joe Sweeney of Slant Magazine called the song a "languid dance-crossover" that drags the album down. Omar Burgess of HipHopDX referred to the song as an album filler. Aziz of Sputnikmusic said the song is "too obsessed with pampering clubgoers to be at all interesting."

== Live performances ==
On January 24, 2014, Schoolboy Q made his network television debut, performing "Man of the Year" on Late Night with Jimmy Fallon. On January 28, 2014, Schoolboy Q performed the song, along with "Collard Greens" and "Break the Bank" on the season finale of DJ Skee's SKEE Live. Then on February 26, 2014, Schoolboy Q performed "Man of the Year" on the Arsenio Hall Show.

== Music video ==
On January 17, 2014, the music video for "Man of the Year", which was directed by Dave Free, Fredo Tovar and Scott Fleishman, was released.

== Charts ==
=== Weekly charts ===
Chart (2013–2014)	Peak position
Belgium (Ultratip Bubbling Under Flanders)	60
Belgium Urban (Ultratop Flanders)	45
US Billboard Hot 100	62
US Hot R&B/Hip-Hop Songs (Billboard)	16
US Hot Rap Songs (Billboard)	7
US Rhythmic Airplay (Billboard)	30

=== Year-end charts ===
Chart (2014)	Position
US Hot R&B/Hip-Hop Songs (Billboard)	55

== Certifications ==
Region	Certification	Certified units/sales
Denmark (IFPI Danmark)	Gold	45,000^{‡}
New Zealand (RMNZ)	2× Platinum	60,000^{‡}
United Kingdom (BPI)	Silver	200,000^{‡}
United States (RIAA)	3× Platinum	3,000,000^{‡}
^{‡} Sales+streaming figures based on certification alone.

== Release history ==
Country	Date	Format	Label
United States	November 23, 2013	Digital download	Top Dawg; Interscope
United States	January 28, 2014	Rhythmic contemporary radio	Top Dawg; Interscope
United Kingdom	March 3, 2014	Urban contemporary radio	Top Dawg; Interscope
