= Collard Greens (song) =

Single by Schoolboy Q featuring Kendrick Lamar

from the album Oxymoron
- Released: June 11, 2013
- Recorded: 2013
- Genre: Psychedelic hip-hop; cloud rap; dub; dirty rap
- Length: 4:59
- Label: Top Dawg; Interscope
- Songwriters: Kendrick Duckworth; Quincy Hanley; Gwen Bunn; Axel Morgan; Ricci Riera
- Producers: THC; Gwen Bunn

Schoolboy Q singles chronology
| "Yay Yay" (2013) | "Collard Greens" (2013) | "White Walls" (2013) |

Kendrick Lamar singles chronology
| "Memories Back Then" (2013) | "Collard Greens" (2013) | "Fragile" (2013) |

Music video
- "Collard Greens" on YouTube

"Collard Greens" is a song by American hip hop recording artist Schoolboy Q, released on June 11, 2013 as the lead single from his third studio album Oxymoron (2014). The song, produced by production team THC and co-produced by Gwen Bunn, features a guest appearance from his Black Hippy cohort, Top Dawg Entertainment labelmate, and fellow American rapper Kendrick Lamar. The song has since peaked at number 92 on the Billboard Hot 100 and number 36 on the UK R&B Chart. It was met with generally positive reviews from music critics.

== Background ==
Schoolboy Q spoke to MTV about the song, saying, "This is like the introduction to the album. This is just getting people excited and getting people ready for what's about to happen." The song's theme is based on smoking marijuana, even though the featured artist Lamar does not smoke.

During the process of Lamar writing his verse, he spoke to a Peruvian man who worked at Interscope Studios, and they came up with a few bars in the Spanish language that he included in his verse, along with a few in French. Q admitted to MTV that he did not understand Lamar's verse and that he had no idea he was going to include a multilingual verse in the song.

== Composition and production ==
Featuring minimal instrumentation, the track is an ambient instrumental composition written in the key of F-sharp minor with a 4/4 meter. Characterized by an upbeat and energetic demeanor, the piece simultaneously conveys two distinct tempos of 154 BPM and 77 BPM, creating a sophisticated polytempo illusion throughout its duration.

Structurally, the composition is built around an i–VIIsus2– i– v chord progression in the home key, moving through F♯m–Esus2–F♯m–C♯m, while blending elements from various contemporary genres. The half-time backbeat incorporates a rhythmic bounce heavily reminiscent of trap by utilizing only half of the actual tempo, while the sub-bass and kick drum patterns are inspired by the steppers rhythm of dub. In contrast, the melodic and harmonic layers invoke a spacious atmosphere typical of cloud rap and ambient, driven by a plucked synthesizer sound that resembles pitched percussion or a mobile phone ringtone in timbre. This synthesizer plays a highly legato melody characterized by heavy reverb and delay effects. Moving away from conventional hip-hop rhythm patterns, the track is propelled by a four-on-the-floor kick drum rhythm, complemented by a persistent off-beat open hi-hat, shaker subdivision that introduces a contrasting double-time feel, and occasional swells from bowed string-like pads. This combination allows the track to project a high-energy pulse while simultaneously radiating a subtly melancholic and introspective undertone.

From a technical and sonic engineering perspective, the production heavily relies on a mix of classic dub-style spatial processing and contemporary cloud rap mixing techniques. Both the instrumental layers and the vocal tracks are treated with dense, cascading delay lines, rhythmic echoes, and expansive reverb effects. Furthermore, the mix dynamically utilizes aggressive panning and meticulous stereo imaging to maximize the depth and width of the stereo field. Despite this highly psychedelic and experimental sonic environment, the overarching production retains a definitive hip-hop identity. This is achieved through a pristine, upfront vocal mix that ensures high intelligibility, combined with drum elements possessing sharp, powerful transients that seamlessly cut through the dense instrumentation to anchor the track's driving groove. The mixing profiles further solidify this genre foundation by emphasizing a powerful sub-bass low-end paired with a crisp, bright high-end response, maintaining structural balance and mainstream accessibility.

== Critical reception ==
"Collard Greens" was met with generally positive reviews from music critics. David Amidon of PopMatters said, "Collard Greens" "is a fantastic single, blending the irreverent wordplay of the Pharcyde or Camp Lo with the reggae-tinged G-funk of DJ Quik or Warren G." David Jeffries of AllMusic called the song brilliant. Stephen Weil of Tiny Mix Tapes praised the song's production and said, "Collard Greens" has a flashy guest verse by Kendrick Lamar and a terrific hook that makes it the most fun, replayable song on the album. Lizzie Plaugic of CMJ stated, the song "could’ve been just another easily forgotten earworm jam with a looming expiration date. But with TDE labelmate Kendrick Lamar lending his nasal-clogged flow to a rapid-fire Spanish-riddled verse and Q’s staccato stutter, the track still has legs. The only difference is that now, that plucking, hollow water-drop beat is instantly recognizable." Jason Lipshutz of Billboard stated, "the truly addictive component of "Collard Greens" is the subtle bounce of [Schoolboy Q's] cadence in the first half of his verses. The bisyllabic screech drives the thudding beat forward, and the technique is even more effective when Q returns after his pal Kendrick Lamar pops up to playfully spit bilingual game."

Craig Jenkins of Pitchfork Media praised the song's production. Richard Perry of No Ripcord said the song is, "a bouncy number defined by its bleeps, rubbery bass, Kendrick's multilingual spitting and Q’s penchant for getting wasted and bedding women." Joe Sweeney of Slant Magazine praised the "fresh-sounding" production of the song. Sam Kriss of TheLineOfBestFit called the song excellent. Michael Madden of Consequence of Sound said, ""Collard Greens" bustles like a multilingual block party." Omar Burgess of HipHopDX said the song has, "all the earmarks of a single but an execution that feels forced. A melodic hook and an intricate enough rhyme pattern power it, but the actual content isn’t particularly inventive."

Complex ranked "Collard Greens", number 28 on their list of the 50 best songs of 2013. Dave Bry elaborated saying, "It's like the Odd Couple. Kendrick is the neatnik Felix Unger to ScHoolboy's slovenly Oscar Madison. The studio is like the apartment they shared on the show—can't you just see Kendrick following a stumbling ScHoolboy around, trying to hold an ashtray under his blunt. Anyway, they both handle the throbbing, bouncy beat that producers THC and Gwen Bun made for them with aplomb, proving why the TDE formula works so well."

== Music video ==
On August 7, 2013, Schoolboy Q appeared on BET's 106 & Park to premiere the music video for "Collard Greens". The video was directed by JeromeD, and features cameo appearances from fellow American rapper Macklemore and production duo Nez & Rio. The psychedelic video features Lamar and Q at a massive house and pool party, accompanied by an abundance of beautiful women. It features the artists mirrored in and out of special effects, such as being seen through a kaleidoscope and the picture being changed to negative. Schoolboy Q credits the video as being his first major record label, big budget music video. He also said he had shot a different video for it, but was unhappy with the final project and chose to shoot a new video.

The week of its release XXL named the video one of the best new hip hop music videos. XXL would also name the music video one of "The 15 Best Hip-Hop Videos Of The Summer".

== Live performances ==
On September 16, 2013, Schoolboy Q and Kendrick Lamar performed "Collard Greens", in New York for Vitamin Water and The Fader's Upcapped concert series. They also performed "Hands on the Wheel" and "Blessed", and featured their new TDE label-mate SZA. The next day they also performed the single on The Arsenio Hall Show. On October 15, 2013, Schoolboy Q and Lamar performed "Collard Greens" in a medley with Lamar's song "Money Trees" at the 2013 BET Hip Hop Awards. On January 28, 2014, Schoolboy Q performed the song, along with "Break the Bank" and "Man of the Year" on the season finale of DJ Skee's SKEE Live. Kendrick Lamar has performed "Collard Greens" at every show on the Damn tour. On June 19, 2024, During Kendrick Lamar's Pop Out performance at the Kia Forum, he brought out Schoolboy Q and performed the song together, with rappers Jay Rock and Ab-Soul also on stage.

== Track listing ==
| No. | Title | Writer(s) | Producer(s) | Length |
|---|---|---|---|---|
| 1. | "Collard Greens" (featuring Kendrick Lamar) | Kendrick Duckworth; Quincy Hanley; Axel Morgan; Ricci Riera | THC; Gwen Bunn | 4:59 |

== Credits and Personnel ==
- Schoolboy Q - vocals, lyricist
- Kendrick Lamar - vocals, lyricist
- Jazmine Bailey - additional vocals
- THC - producer, composer
- Gwen Bunn - producer, composer
- James Hunt - recording engineer, assistant mixing engineer
- Derek "MixedByAli" Ali - mixing engineer
- Mike Bozzi - mastering engineer

== Charts ==
Weekly chart performance for "Collard Greens"
| Chart (2013–2014) | Peak position |
|---|---|
| UK Singles (The Official Charts Company) | 184 |
| UK Hip Hop/R&B (Official Charts) | 36 |
| US Billboard Hot 100 | 92 |
| US Hot R&B/Hip-Hop Songs (Billboard) | 28 |
| US Heatseekers Songs (Billboard) | 9 |
| US Rhythmic Airplay (Billboard) | 35 |

== Certifications ==
| Region | Certification | Certified units/sales |
|---|---|---|
| Denmark (IFPI Danmark) | Gold | 45,000^{‡} |
| New Zealand (RMNZ) | 4× Platinum | 120,000^{‡} |
| United Kingdom (BPI) | Gold | 400,000^{‡} |
| United States (RIAA) | 4× Platinum | 4,000,000^{‡} |
^{‡} Sales+streaming figures based on certification alone.

== Release history ==
| Country | Date | Format | Label |
|---|---|---|---|
| United States | June 11, 2013 | Digital download | Top Dawg; Interscope |
| United States | July 18, 2013 | Mainstream urban radio | Top Dawg; Interscope |
| United States | August 27, 2013 | Rhythmic contemporary radio | Top Dawg; Interscope |
| United States | August 27, 2013 | Urban contemporary radio | Top Dawg; Interscope |
