= Amethyst (mixtape) =

Mixtape by Tinashe
- Released: March 16, 2015
- Recorded: December 2014
- Genre: Alt-pop
- Length: 27:15
- Label: Self-released
- Producers: Ritz Reynolds; Mae N. Maejor; Smash David; Nez & Rio; DJ Dahi; Iamsu!; Ryan Hemsworth

Tinashe chronology
| Aquarius (2014) | Amethyst (2015) | Nightride (2016) |

Amethyst is the fourth mixtape by American singer Tinashe. Released independently on March 16, 2015, as a free project for her fans, the mixtape follows her continued emphasis on independent creative control, including self-directed visual work in the period after her debut album Aquarius (2014). The seven-track project, recorded in her bedroom during her Christmas vacation, features production from Ryan Hemsworth, Iamsu, and DJ Dahi. Titled after Tinashe's birthstone, Amethyst presents a blend of alternative pop and contemporary R&B, incorporating sparse piano motifs, heavy bass, and darker textures alongside mid-tempo tracks.

The mixtape received generally positive reviews from music critics. Outlets such as Pitchfork, Jezebel, Stereogum, Billboard, and Dazed highlighted its atmospheric production, layered vocals, and its continuity with the moodier elements of Aquarius. Amethyst was later included on several year-end lists, including Complex's 15 Mixtapes That Should Have Won Grammys and their ranking of the Best Albums of 2015.

== Background ==
In the lead-up to Amethyst, Tinashe continued working independently on the visual aspects of her music. Speaking to W Magazine, she explained her approach after releasing the visual for "Bated Breath" from 2014's Aquarius the previous week. Noting that her label was not prioritizing music video production at the time, she stated that she preferred to take initiative—either creating visuals herself or collaborating directly with creatives she admired—remarking, "I don't like to sit around waiting for people to do things for me", and adding that her attitude was essentially, "I'll just do it". Tinashe then released Amethyst, as a "thank you" to fans and as a nod to her DIY roots.

== Recording and release ==
Half a year after releasing her debut album Aquarius (2014), Tinashe released a seven-track mixtape, titled Amethyst, as a gift to her fans. The tracklist was released through the online website HotNewHipHop, and the mixtape became available to be downloaded in the same publication. Titled after Tinashe's birthstone, it includes contributions from Ryan Hemsworth, Iamsu, DJ Dahi and among others, while it doesn't feature any artists. According to Tinashe, the tracks were recorded in her bedroom over her Christmas vacation.

== Music and lyrics ==
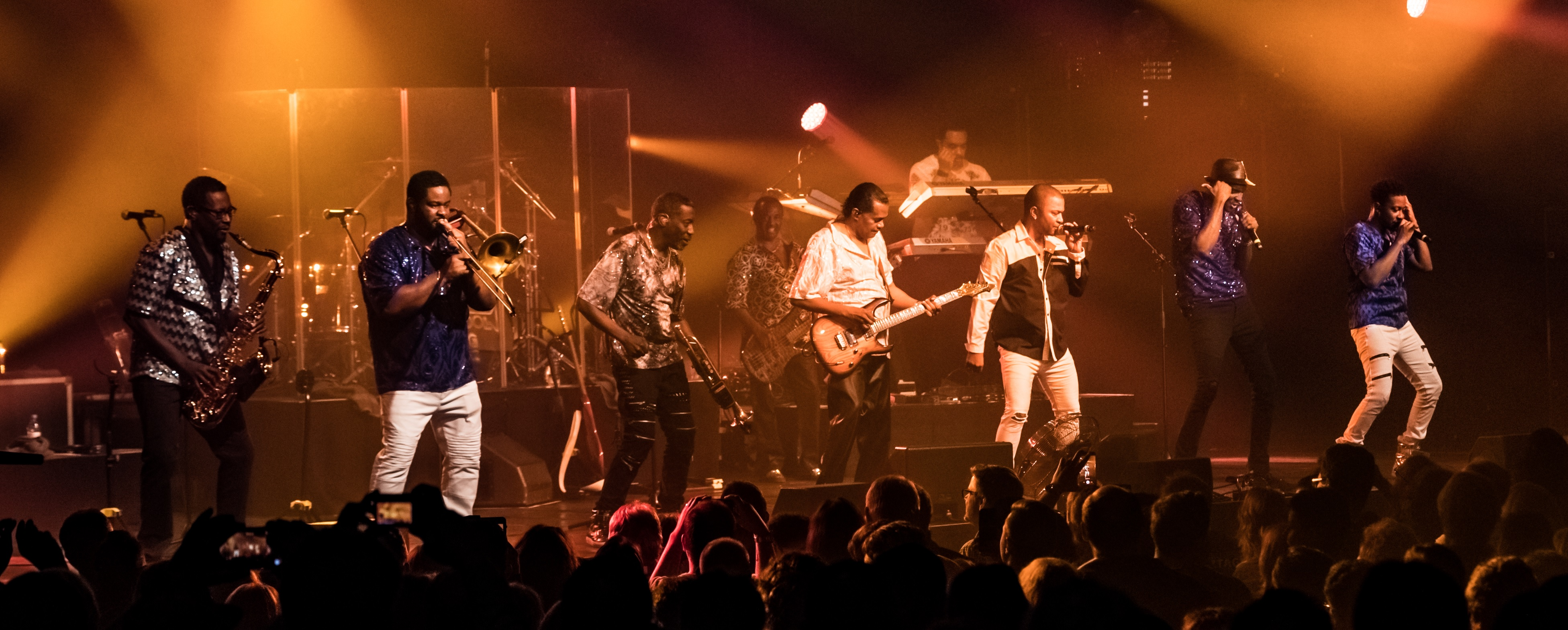
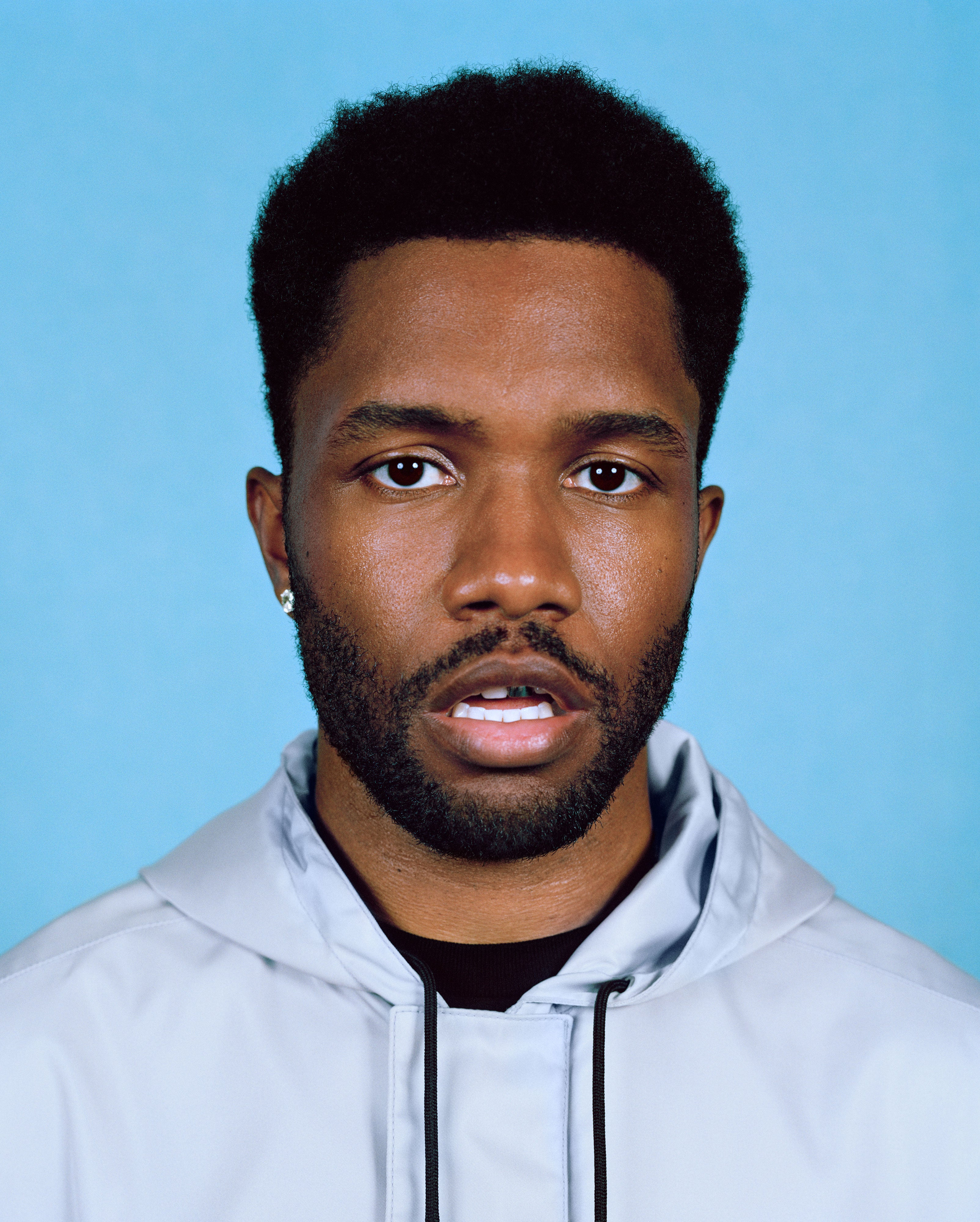
Tinashe used elements from Kool & the Gang's "Summer Madness" on "Wrong" (top) and drew inspiration from Frank Ocean's Channel Orange–era sound on "Something to Feel" and "Wanderer". (bottom)

Amethyst is an alt-pop mixtape, according to Billboard. "Dreams Are Real", built around a sparse piano motif and a heavy bass line contrasted with lighter percussive snaps and airy drums, incorporates variety of the core elements of contemporary R&B production. According to Billboard's Elias Leight, the track concludes with a repeated exclamation—"the future is mine"—which contributes to its triumphant tone. In "Wrong", Tinashe "chart a course through a dark R&B patchwork". Produced by Ryan Hemsworth, the song borrows from the Kool & the Gang classic "Summer Madness", which yielded "impressive results". "Something to Feel" and "Wanderer" gesture toward the swaying, wounded textures associated with Channel Orange–era Frank Ocean. The mid-tempo "Worth It" contributes to making Amethyst "more than worthy of your ear", particularly for people who appreciate "good old fashioned R&B".

== Critical reception ==
Professional ratings
Review scores
| Source | Rating |
|---|---|
| HotNewHipHop | 95% |
| Now | 3/5 stars |
| Pitchfork | 7.1/10 |
| PopMatters | 7/10 |

Amethyst received generally positive reviews, with Pitchfork's Meaghan Garvey saying that "it reminds us that Tinashe has come to seem like a uniquely genuine presence in R&B". Julianne Shepherd of Jezebel also wrote a positive review on the mixtape, describing the mixtape as "there's an ease and intellect, a fortitude and freedom". Stereogum writer Caitlin White noted that Amethyst as a solid follow-up that reinforces her status as a promising new R&B artist, which continues the lush, moody atmosphere of Aquarius, highlighting Tinashe's blend of airy vocals and sing-talk delivery. Billboard author Elias Leight highlighted the singer's shifting, layered vocal delivery, commenting that she evokes post-disco R&B while also adopting a cadence reminiscent of Drake's "Company". Thomas Gorton from Dazed praised the mixtape's "lo-fi, dusty production" and noted how it sits behind Tinashe's lovelorn vocal, which "peaks wonderfully" with touches of Auto-Tune, also pointing out that Amethyst takes its name from her birthstone.

The mixtape was later named 15 Mixtapes That Should Have Won Grammys by Complex, stating that "Amethyst was one of 2015's strongest coming-of-age R&B projects, second only to Bieber if we expand that distinction to include pop". They also listed the mixtape at number 24 of the Best Albums of 2015.

== Track listing ==
Amethyst track listing
| No. | Title | Writer(s) | Producer(s) | Length |
|---|---|---|---|---|
| 1. | "Dreams Are Real" | Tinashe Kachingwe; David Jimenez | Mae N. Maejor; Smash David | 3:43 |
| 2. | "Wrong" | Kachingwe; Ryan Hemsworth | Hemsworth | 4:20 |
| 3. | "Something to Feel" | Kachingwe; Nesbitt Wesonga Jr.; Mario Loving | Nez & Rio | 2:26 |
| 4. | "Looking 4 It" | Kachingwe; Anthony "Legacy" Thomas | Legacy | 4:05 |
| 5. | "Wanderer" | Kachingwe; Brent Reynolds; Dacoury Natche | Ritz Reynolds; DJ Dahi | 3:19 |
| 6. | "Worth It" (featuring Iamsu!) | Kachingwe; Sudan Williams | Iamsu! | 4:51 |
| 7. | "Just the Way I Like You" | Kachingwe; Reynolds | Ritz Reynolds | 4:31 |

== Release history ==
| Region | Date | Format | Label | Ref. |
|---|---|---|---|---|
| Various | March 16, 2015 | CD; digital download; streaming; vinyl | Self-released | |
