= Hell of a Night (Schoolboy Q song) =

Single by Schoolboy Q

from the album Oxymoron
- Released: October 21, 2014
- Recorded: 2013
- Genre: Hip hop; trap; hyphy
- Length: 4:32
- Label: TDE; Interscope
- Songwriters: Quincy Hanley; Dacoury Natche; Sam Skinner
- Producers: JayFrance; DJ Dahi

Schoolboy Q singles chronology
"Studio" (2014)	"Hell of a Night" (2014)	"Bitches N Marijuana" (2015)

"Hell of a Night" (stylized as "Hell of a NigHt") is a song by American hip hop recording artist Schoolboy Q, taken from his major label debut studio album Oxymoron (2014). The track, which features production by two American record producers DJ Dahi, and JayFrance was serviced to urban contemporary radio as the fourth and final official single from Oxymoron on October 21, 2014. It was met with generally positive reviews from music critics.

== Background ==
The song first surfaced in unmastered form during the 2013 NBA Playoffs and was confirmed to be leaked by the NBA (according to Schoolboy Q himself). He stated that the song was unfinished and that it would be tagged with "Mixed By Ali" when it was ready.

== Critical reception ==
"Hell of a Night" was met with generally positive reviews from music critics. Jason Lipshutz of Billboard stated, "Hell of a Night" "features some of Schoolboy Q's slinkiest rhymes about fast-living and hypnotizing women. With an spooky harmony floating in the background and a drum machine snapping Q's syllables shut, "Hell Of A Night" is the album's non-single with the most potential to become a hit." Maya Kalev writing for Fact said the song, "is a twisted banger, but the predicted drop never materialises, and the effect is weirdly disorienting as Q's rapid-fire raps cut through oohing vocal samples." Craig Jenkins of Pitchfork Media said the song, "showcases a trap-house hybrid from DJ Dahi and Q cuts loose, partying hard because he's lived hard enough to deserve it" Julia Leconte of Now praised JayFrance and DJ Dahi's production. Nathan S of DJBooth said, "you'll levy some criticism at "Hell of a Night", although there's some real grit in the verses surrounding that club anthem hook and bridge."

Brandon Soderberg of Spin said, the song was "a party track begging for a Zedd remix that flirts with EDM histrionics, but perversely denies us the true dance-floor climax it suggests." Andrew Spragg of The Quietus stated that the song was forgettable. Aziz of Sputnikmusic said the song "exudes gleaming catchiness – the ad-libbing on its final verse makes it one of the most enjoyable on the album – its hook is unbearably corny." Joe Sweeney of Slant Magazine called the song a "languid dance-crossover" that drags the album down. Omar Burgess of HipHopDX referred to the song as album filler. Sam Kriss of TheLineOfBestFit said, ""Hell of a Night" is a perfectly acceptable trap banger, full of richly throbbing bass and slick hi-hat rolls, but it's a sadly formulaic break from the more compelling stuff elsewhere" on the album.

== Music video ==
The official music video was released November 7, 2014 shortly after the track was sent to radio. The video features Schoolboy Q in a wild house party

== Legacy ==
"Hell of a Night" went on to be featured in season 1 of USA Network show, Mr. Robot.

== Charts ==
=== Weekly charts ===
Chart (2014)	Peak position
US Hot R&B/Hip-Hop Songs (Billboard)	46
US R&B/Hip-Hop Airplay (Billboard)	31

== Certifications ==
Region	Certification	Certified units/sales
New Zealand (RMNZ)	Gold	15,000^{‡}
United States (RIAA)	Gold	500,000^{‡}
^{‡} Sales+streaming figures based on certification alone.

== Release history ==
Region	Date	Format	Label
United States	October 21, 2014	Urban contemporary radio	Top Dawg; Interscope
United States	November 4, 2014	Rhythmic contemporary radio	Top Dawg; Interscope
