= What They Want (Schoolboy Q song) =

Song by Schoolboy Q featuring 2 Chainz

from the album Oxymoron
- Released: February 25, 2014
- Recorded: 2013
- Genre: Hip hop
- Length: 4:27
- Label: Top Dawg; Interscope
- Songwriters: Quincy Hanley; Tauheed Epps; Micheal Williams; Marquel Middlebrooks
- Producers: Mike Will Made It; Marz (co.)

"What They Want" (stylized as "WHat THey Want") is a song by American hip hop recording artist Schoolboy Q, taken from his third studio album Oxymoron (2014). The song, produced by Mike Will Made It, features a guest appearance by rapper 2 Chainz. "What They Want" was met with generally positive reviews from music critics. The song has since peaked on the US Billboard Bubbling Under R&B/Hip-Hop Singles at number four.

== Composition ==
"What They Want" production features "plodding rhythm section and eerie, reverb-drenched string/bell loops" created by Mike Will Made It and Marz. Schoolboy Q raps about his prospective purchases and recent sexual conquests in his verses. Additionally the song features a guest appearance by 2 Chainz. Overall the song has an icy melody projecting a feeling of paranoia with Q rapping about his proficiency in drug dealing.

== Critical reception ==
"What They Want" was met with generally positive reviews from music critics. Luke Fox of Exclaim! called the song hypnotic and stated that Q outshines 2 Chainz on the song. Michael Madden of Consequence of Sound stated it had one of the album's standout productions. Jason Lipshutz of Billboard said, "Q is too serious-minded to stuff his debut with one-liners about booties, though, and instead pulls 2 Chainz into his murky world on "What They Want," a chilling stunner in which the headliner channels his aggression into peddling another bleak anthem to his supporters." Greg Whitt of Uproxx's Smoking Section said, "2 Chainz is so ubiquitous that just seeing his name on a tracklist screams cliche. Thankfully, his verse over Mike WiLL Made It’s subdued production on "What They Want" is about as 2 Chainz a verse that exists. Filled with delightfully odd non sequiturs and dopeboy freshness, the ATL Codeine Cowboy pairs with Q like lean and Sprite." Omar Burgess of HipHopDX stated, "listeners in search of lighter fare will likely gravitate toward "What They Want"." Maya Kalev of Fact said it is "a track that’s lyrically unambitious, but full of menace thanks to Q’s snarling flow." Nathan S of DJBooth stated, "Chainz is at his best when he’s at his most outrageous and borderline absurd, the exact opposite of Q, and the fact that the song still works is testament to ScHoolboy’s versatility, but it’s also one of the album’s least compelling tracks."

== Live performances ==
Schoolboy Q and 2 Chainz performed "What They Want" at SXSW on March 11, 2014. Then on April 3, 2014, Schoolboy Q performed the song on Jimmy Kimmel Live!.

== Music video ==
The music video for "What They Want" was filmed in New Orleans, Louisiana, directed by Motion Family. On March 6, 2014, the video was released. In the video Q and 2 Chainz visit an above-ground cemetery, stalk a church with dudes wearing skeleton masks, and go to New Orleans strip club She She's, which is full of twerking dancers. The video is completed with shots of "creepy, abandoned buildings, red-lit strip clubs, empty parking lots, gray graveyards and backlit churches."

== Chart performance ==
Chart (2014)	Peak position
US Bubbling Under R&B/Hip-Hop Singles (Billboard)	4

== Certifications ==
Region	Certification	Certified units/sales
United States (RIAA)	Gold	500,000^{‡}
^{‡} Sales+streaming figures based on certification alone.
