= Studio (song) =

- Cover artwork for the official remix

Single by Schoolboy Q featuring BJ the Chicago Kid

from the album Oxymoron
- Released: April 22, 2014
- Length: 4:38
- Label: Top Dawg; Interscope
- Songwriters: Quincy Hanley; Bryan Sledge; Steve Thornton
- Producer: Swiff D

Schoolboy Q singles chronology
"2 On" (2014)	"Studio" (2014)	"Hell of a Night" (2014)

BJ the Chicago Kid singles chronology
"Good Luv'n" (2012)	"Studio" (2014)	"Church" (2015)

Music video
- "Studio" on YouTube

"Studio" is a song by the American hip-hop recording artist Schoolboy Q, released on April 22, 2014, by Top Dawg Entertainment and Interscope Records, as the third official single from his third album, Oxymoron (2014). The song, which features vocals from BJ the Chicago Kid, was recorded in 2013 and produced by Swiff D.

== Music video ==
The song's music video, directed by Jerome D, was released on April 22, 2014.

== Remix ==
The official remix features a verse by the American rapper Nas.

== Commercial performance ==
The song peaked at number 38 on the US Billboard Hot 100 chart, becoming his highest-charting single on that chart as a lead artist. It also topped the US Hot R&B/Hip-Hop Airplay chart. It appeared on the Billboard Hot 100 year-end chart at number 96 despite only peaking at number 38, making it the fourth lowest-peaking song to be included on the Billboard Hot 100 year-end chart. The song has been certified triple platinum by the Recording Industry Association of America (RIAA) for sales and streams of over 3 million units.

== Awards and nominations ==
Year	Ceremony	Award	Result
2014	2014 BET Hip Hop Awards	Best Collabo, Duo or Group	Nominated
2014	2014 BET Hip Hop Awards	Track of the Year	Nominated
2015	2015 Grammy Awards	Best Rap/Sung Collaboration	Nominated

== Charts ==
=== Weekly charts ===
Weekly chart performance for "Studio"
Chart (2014)	Peak position
Belgium Urban (Ultratop Flanders)	46
US Billboard Hot 100	38
US Hot R&B/Hip-Hop Songs (Billboard)	10
US Rhythmic Airplay (Billboard)	2

=== Year-end charts ===
2014 year-end chart performance for "Studio"
Chart (2014)	Position
US Billboard Hot 100	96
US Hot R&B/Hip-Hop Songs (Billboard)	24
US Rhythmic (Billboard)	20

== Certifications ==
Certifications and sales for "Studio"
Region	Certification	Certified units/sales
New Zealand (RMNZ)	2× Platinum	60,000^{‡}
United States (RIAA)	3× Platinum	3,000,000^{‡}
^{‡} Sales+streaming figures based on certification alone.

== Release history ==
Release dates for "Studio"
Region	Date	Format	Label
United States	April 22, 2014	Urban contemporary radio	Top Dawg; Interscope
