= Hands on the Wheel =

Single by Schoolboy Q featuring A$AP Rocky

from the album Habits & Contradictions
- Released: April 3, 2012
- Recorded: 2012
- Genre: Hip hop
- Length: 3:17
- Label: Top Dawg; Interscope
- Songwriters: Quincy Hanley; Rakim Mayers; Scott Mescudi; Julian Nixon; Craig Balmoris
- Producer: Melvyn "Nyte Da Don" Gonzalez

Schoolboy Q singles chronology
| "Druggys wit Hoes Again" (2011) | "Hands on the Wheel" (2012) | "Yay Yay" (2013) |

A$AP Rocky singles chronology
| "Purple Swag" (2011) | "Hands on the Wheel" (2012) | "Goldie" (2012) |

Music video
- "Hands on the Wheel" on YouTube

"Hands on the Wheel" (stylized as "Hands on tHe WHeel") is a song by American hip hop recording artist Schoolboy Q, released on April 3, 2012, as the second single from his second album, Habits & Contradictions (2012). The song, produced by Best Kept Secret, features a guest verse from fellow American rapper A$AP Rocky. The song samples American musician Kid Cudi's hit single "Pursuit of Happiness," as performed live by American folk singer Lissie.

== Background ==
After announcing his signing to Interscope Records in March 2012, Interscope released "Hands on the Wheel" as a single via iTunes and began promoting the song at Urban and Rhythmic radio formats in North America. The song would become his first to feature a placement on any of the Billboard charts.

== Chart performance ==
| Chart (2012) | Peak position |
|---|---|
| US Hot R&B/Hip-Hop Songs (Billboard) | 105 |

== Certifications ==
| Region | Certification | Certified units/sales |
|---|---|---|
| New Zealand (RMNZ) | Platinum | 30,000^{‡} |
| United States (RIAA) | Gold | 500,000^{‡} |
^{‡} Sales+streaming figures based on certification alone.

== Release history ==
| Country | Date | Format | Label |
|---|---|---|---|
| United States | April 3, 2012 | Digital download | Top Dawg Entertainment, Interscope Records |
