= Break the Bank (song) =

Promotional single by Schoolboy Q

from the album Oxymoron
- Released: January 21, 2014
- Recorded: 2012
- Genre: Hip hop
- Length: 5:54
- Label: TDE; Interscope
- Songwriters: Quincy Hanley; Alan Maman; Mark Spears
- Producer: The Alchemist

"Break the Bank" (stylized as "Break tHe Bank") is a song by American hip hop recording artist Schoolboy Q, released on January 21, 2014, by Top Dawg Entertainment (TDE) and Interscope Records, as a promotional single from his major label debut studio album Oxymoron (2014). The song was recorded in 2012 and was produced by The Alchemist. The song has since peaked at number 32 on the US Billboard Hot R&B/Hip-Hop Songs chart.

== Background ==
On January 21, 2014, Schoolboy Q released the "Break the Bank", as a promotional single from his major-label debut album Oxymoron. It was also made available with the pre-order of the album on iTunes. The song was recorded in 2012 around the release of Kendrick Lamar's Good Kid, m.A.A.d city, being one of the older records featured on the album he raps: "Tell Kendrick move from the throne, I came for it," referencing Lamar's recent rise to superstardom. This was one of the first records recorded for Oxymoron.

== Composition ==
The song is a six-minute eerie, rattling song, produced by The Alchemist. The hook which includes the line, "so now we 'bout to break the bank, money be on my mind," sets the tone for the song as Schoolboy Q raps about how he's earned his living. He also counts the spoils of his most recent "rap heist". The production was described as, a "jarring blend of droning piano and old-school, truck-rattling bass" by Consequence of Sound. The music was sampled from "Something is Happening" the fifth track on Man's 1976 album The Welsh Connection.

== Critical reception ==
"Break the Bank" was met with generally positive reviews from music critics. David Jeffries of AllMusic called it an accessible highlight of the album. Lizzie Plaugic of CMJ referred to the song as one of the album's essential tracks. Michael Madden of Consequence of Sound named it one of the album's best tracks saying, "The most ambitious moment on Oxymoron, is the six-minute “Break the Bank”. Produced by The Alchemist, who hasn't had a better, higher-profile showing this decade, it's all inchworm piano runs and vinyl crackle, taking the 'If you ain’t talking money...' cliché to new heights. The song starts as an ode to the promises of wealth. [...] It's a wildly drunk-sounding song, but it's all sober thinking." Jason Lipshutz of Billboard said, "ScHoolboy Q's lock-step rhyme schemes and ping-ponging intensity -- every time you think he's about to fly off the handle, he dials his energy back down and powers up for another peak. Q is less concerned with fashioning a radio hook here than nailing the internal rhymes of the second verse, but he accomplishes his goal and then some."

Josiah Hughes of Exclaim! called it a "hard-hitting hip-hop throwback" that puts "the rapper's high-energy delivery on display." Maya Kalev writing for Fact praised the song's production. Craig Jenkins of Pitchfork Media said the song, "follows suit in affixing the happy ending to Oxymoron’s war stories while serving up the album’s most memorable hooks."

Complex named it the twenty-seventh best song of the first half of 2014. Angel Diaz commented saying, "This beat is monstrous. [...] Those drums and the piano in the faint distance are just filthy. And ScHoolboy goes the fuck off on this track, making it hard to play this song only once. It's also very hard not to break your neck when this joint comes on."

== Commercial performance ==
The week of its release, the song received numerous streams on multiple platforms. It was the most streamed song on hip hop website HipHopDX that week. It was also the sixth most streamed song of the week on Spotify. In its first week of availability the song debuted at number 33 on the US Billboard Hot R&B/Hip-Hop Songs chart, receiving 27,000 downloads during the week.

== Live performances ==
Following the 56th Annual Grammy Awards on January 26, 2014, Top Dawg Entertainment hosted a fan appreciation concert at House of Blues in Los Angeles to celebrate Kendrick Lamar's seven award nominations. Here, all of the members of the record label performed. Schoolboy Q's set included his first public performance of "Break the Bank". On January 28, 2014, Schoolboy Q performed the song, along with "Collard Greens" and "Man of the Year" on the season finale of DJ Skee's SKEE Live.

== Music video ==
On July 3, 2013, Schoolboy Q tweeted he had finished filming the second music video for Oxymoron, which he revealed was for "Break the Bank". The video, directed by Jason Goldwatch, was shot in Los Angeles, California. The video was released on February 21, 2014, and features Schoolboy Q playing the piano, keeping company with the locals from his old neighborhood, getting harassed by the police and interacting with his daughter Joy, who appears throughout the video. As of June 2016, the music video has over 12.7 million views on YouTube. Also, the video has a cameo from The Alchemist, who produced the song and often collaborates with Jason Goldwatch.

== Track listing ==
No.	Title	Writer(s)	Producer(s)	Length
1.	"Break the Bank"	Quincy Hanley; Alan Maman; Mark Spears	The Alchemist	5:54

== Chart performance ==
Chart (2014)	Peak position
Australia Urban (ARIA)	25
US Bubbling Under Hot 100 (Billboard)	15
US Hot R&B/Hip-Hop Songs (Billboard)	32

== Certifications ==
Region	Certification	Certified units/sales
United States (RIAA)	Gold	500,000^{‡}
^{‡} Sales+streaming figures based on certification alone.

== Release history ==
Country	Date	Format	Label
United States	January 21, 2014	Digital download	Top Dawg; Interscope
