= Habits & Contradictions =

Studio album by Schoolboy Q
- Released: January 14, 2012
- Genre: West Coast hip-hop; gangsta rap
- Length: 67:42
- Label: TDE
- Producer: Dude Dawg (exec.); Dave Free (also co-exec.); Punch (co-exec.); The Alchemist; ASAP Ty Beats; Best Kept Secret; DJ Dahi; Lex Luger; Mike Will Made It; Nez & Rio; Sounwave; Tabu; Tae Beast; THC; Willie B

Schoolboy Q chronology
Setbacks (2011)	Habits & Contradictions (2012)	Oxymoron (2014)

Singles from Habits & Contradictions
- 1. "Druggys wit Hoes Again" Released: October 11, 2011; 2. "Hands on the Wheel" Released: April 3, 2012

Habits & Contradictions is the second studio album by American rapper Schoolboy Q. It was released on January 14, 2012, exclusively on iTunes, by Top Dawg Entertainment (TDE). The album features guest appearances from ASAP Rocky, Jhené Aiko, Dom Kennedy, Currensy, Ab-Soul, Kendrick Lamar and Jay Rock. The production was handled by American producers The Alchemist, Lex Luger, Mike Will Made It, Best Kept Secret and ASAP Ty Beats, as well as members of Top Dawg Entertainment in-house production team Digi+Phonics.

== Background ==
On September 22, 2011, via his Twitter feed, Schoolboy Q announced the title of his second independent album to be Habits & Contradictions. He described it as a "prequel to Setbacks". On September 26, he released the first offering off the album, a song titled "Druggys wit Hoes Again" featuring Ab-Soul. The song was originally titled "Extra Pills", however Schoolboy Q said it reminded him so much of "'Druggys wit Hoes' times 10". The song was later released to iTunes on October 11, 2011.

On October 19, 2011, he leaked "There He Go", followed by "Oxy Music" on October 28. To keep promoting Habits & Contradictions he released "My Hatin' Joint" on November 15, 2011, succeeded by a music video for a track titled "Sacrilegious" on November 29, 2011. On January 2, 2012, Schoolboy Q released another song, "Blessed" featuring Kendrick Lamar and announced the album's release date to be January 14, 2012.

On January 6, 2012, via Twitter, Schoolboy Q revealed guest appearances on the album would include ASAP Rocky, Currensy and Dom Kennedy. On January 6, Schoolboy Q also released a public service announcement for Habits & Contradictions, shot and edited by Dwayne LaFleur. Complex named the song "Hands on the Wheel" number 12 on their list of the 50 best songs of 2012. Complex also ranked the album cover the tenth best of 2012, designed by Hassana Lynne and Dave Free.

== Content ==
The album opens with "Sacrilegious" a morose narrative following the contradictions of a killer seeking salvation. Aaron Matthews of Exclaim! noted "'Sacrilegious' and 'Blessed' bookend the album as dual statements of purpose; the former sees Q lamenting his gangbanging past, while the latter unites Q with fellow Black Hippy Kendrick Lamar to celebrate life and count his blessings." OnSMASH claims "The 17 track project, due out January 14, is a look into Q's life, with tales of pill selling, life struggle, partying, religious hypocrites, his block and everything in between."

Schoolboy Q sat down with freeOnSmash, for an interview and spoke on some of the tracks from the album, the interview was released on January 9, 2012. In the interview with freeOnSmash Schoolboy Q stated "Blessed" and "Sacrilegious" are "basically the two title tracks".

He described "Blessed" is a record where, he's saying no matter how hard times are: "you can be straight. You're blessed bruh. There's no reason to be stressing the way you're stressing. Like I don't get this; I had somebody tell me they're broke, they're stressing with money, but how are you broke and you got your fucking cable on? It don't make sense. How when we about to go to the store, you got on a leather jacket, you got some Gucci and Jordan shoes talking about how you're broke? You might have to make better decisions, but at the end of the day, you're blessed bruh. Every day you have more than somebody. Every day. Every day you'll be doing better than somebody, so there's no reason to be complaining or stressing over shit even though it's gonna happen, but it comes a time where you gotta look at it like, "I'm straight." Better luck next week. Better luck tomorrow."

His representation or account in words of "Sacrilegious" is: "It's about a motherfucker that's — he's trying, but he keeps contradicting himself. He's basically going to church and as soon as he leaves church, he's going to kill somebody. He just can't get over that hump with life and shit. With the video, I made the video to where at the end the nigga just killed himself going through so much trials and so much trouble in his life. Just wig yourself man, fuck it. That's what it comes down to when you're in that mind state and you just keep fucking up and bringing yourself down. All that shit just catches up and wears you down. People that are sacrilegious are the worst type of people man. They're worse than a liar to me."

== Critical reception ==
Professional ratings
Aggregate scores
Source	Rating
AnyDecentMusic?	7.5/10
Metacritic	78/100
Review scores
Source	Rating
AllMusic	4/5 stars
AllHipHop	7.5/10
The A.V. Club	B
Beats Per Minute	87%
The Boston Phoenix	3.5/4 stars
HipHopDX	4.0/5
Pitchfork	8.4/10
Rolling Stone	3.5/5 stars
XXL	4/5

Habits & Contradictions received critical acclaim from critics. At Metacritic, which assigns a normalized rating out of 100 to reviews from mainstream publications, the album received an average score of 78, based on 16 reviews. On the week of its release Stereogum announced Habits & Contradictions as their 'Album of the Week'. Jon Garcia of AllHipHop praised "his aggressive, almost angry, rapping style" claiming "there is no shortage of that here. 'Raymond 1969' sounds like something out of a horror film, with Schoolboy riffing about endless violent acts. The horror theme follows on 'Nightmare on Figg St', where Q makes a play on last year's biggest hit." Exclaim! writer Aaron Matthews called the album's guest appearances "infrequent but well-chosen: 'Hands on the Wheel' reunites Q with ASAP Rocky over a moody Lissie loop to big up illegal substances, while 'Groovline Pt.1' boasts a surprisingly smooth Lex Luger concoction with verses by Currensy and Dom Kennedy." However Matthews ended with "Habits & Contradictions is a cohesive and compelling exploration of a man torn between his past and his present. Get the album."

Ivan Rott of Hip Hop Is Read described Habits & Contradictions as "an impressively thorough project which further establishes [ScHoolboy Q's] trademark as a solo artist." Henry Yanney of SoulCulture wrote "ScHoolBoy Q definitely stands as the most animated of the quartet and H&C really brings to life his attention grabbing, wild styles. From residing in a mellow trance on 'My Hatin' Joint' to breaking into somewhat scary hysterics on 'Oxy Music,' ScHoolBoy provides an energetic, eclectic listening experience. Yanney praised its raw sound: "Sounding very much like an underground album where the 'rules' are few and far between, ScHoolBoy Q's second street album is unadulterated material – which at times is raw even to the most sternest of ears. But Habits & Contradictions is a mesmerising listening experience; mixing the anger, exuberance and passionate flow of its protagonist with an eclipsing score, making for yet another staple moment for the small West Coast outfit taking huge strides with each release." Jayson Greene of Pitchfork noted "Habits & Contradictions is, accordingly, a dark and moody listen, but it never bogs down in momentum or succumbs to despair".

=== Accolades ===
Habits & Contradictions was named the fifth best album of 2012 by Complex. The album was listed 31st on Stereogum's list of top 50 albums of 2012. Pitchfork ranked it 25th on their Top 50 Albums of 2012 list In October 2013, Complex named it the ninth best hip hop album of the last five years.

== Commercial performance ==
Habits & Contradictions debuted at number 111 on the US Billboard 200, with first-week sales of 3,000 digital copies in the United States. The album also debuted on the US Top R&B/Hip-Hop Albums at number 25, US Rap Albums at number 16, US Independent Albums at number 17 and at number three on the US Top Heatseekers, respectively. As of February 2014, the album has sold 48,000 copies in the United States.

== Track listing ==
No.	Title	Producer	Length
1.	"Sacrilegious"	Tabu	3:31
2.	"There He Go"	Sounwave	3:20
3.	"Hands on the Wheel" (featuring ASAP Rocky)	Best Kept Secret	3:17
4.	"Sex Drive" (featuring Jhené Aiko)	THC	3:22
5.	"Oxy Music"	THC	3:47
6.	"My Hatin' Joint"	Mike Will Made It	4:14
7.	"Tookie Knows (Interlude)"	Dave Free; Tae Beast	1:26
8.	"Raymond 1969"	Sounwave; Dave Free	4:50
9.	"Sexting"	DJ Dahi	3:21
10.	"Grooveline Pt. 1" (featuring Dom Kennedy and Currensy)	Lex Luger	5:00
11.	"Gangsta in Designer (No Concept)"	Willie B	3:48
12.	"How We Feeling"	Dave Free	3:11
13.	"Druggys wit Hoes Again" (featuring Ab-Soul)	Nez & Rio	3:39
14.	"Nightmare on Figg St."	ASAP Ty Beats	3:36
15.	"My Homie"	The Alchemist	3:47
16.	"Blessed" (featuring Kendrick Lamar)	Dave Free	5:03
17.	"Niggahs.already.know.davers.flow"	Nez & Rio	3:53
18.	"2 Raw" (featuring Jay Rock)	Tae Beast	4:38
Total length:			67:43

Notes

- "Raymond 1969", “Blessed” and "How We Feeling" do not appear on the Spotify version of the album.

Sample credits

- "There He Go" contains samples of "Wet and Rusting", as performed by Menomena; and "One Man Band (Plays All Alone)", as performed by Monk Higgins.
- "Hands on the Wheel" contains a sample of "Pursuit of Happiness", written by Scott Mescudi and performed live by Lissie.
- "My Hatin' Joint" contains a sample of "Image", as performed by Brian Bennett.
- "Raymond 1969" contains a sample of "Cowboys", as performed by Portishead.
- "Grooveline Pt. 1" contains a sample of "Feel Like Makin' Love", as performed by Marlena Shaw.
- "Gangsta in Designer (No Concept)" contains a sample of "Firth of Fifth", as performed by Genesis.
- "Nightmare on Figg St." contains an interpolation of "Niggas in Paris", as performed by Kanye West and Jay-Z.
- "Blessed" contains a sample of "Fall Into You", as performed by SoulStice.
- "2 Raw" contains a sample of "Merlin the Magician", as performed by Rick Wakeman.

== Charts ==
Chart (2012)	Peak position
US Billboard 200	111
US Top R&B/Hip-Hop Albums (Billboard)	25
US Top Rap Albums (Billboard)	16
US Top Independent Albums (Billboard)	17
US Heatseekers Albums (Billboard)	3

== See also ==
- Gangsta rap
