= Schoolboy Q discography =

Hip hop recording artist discography

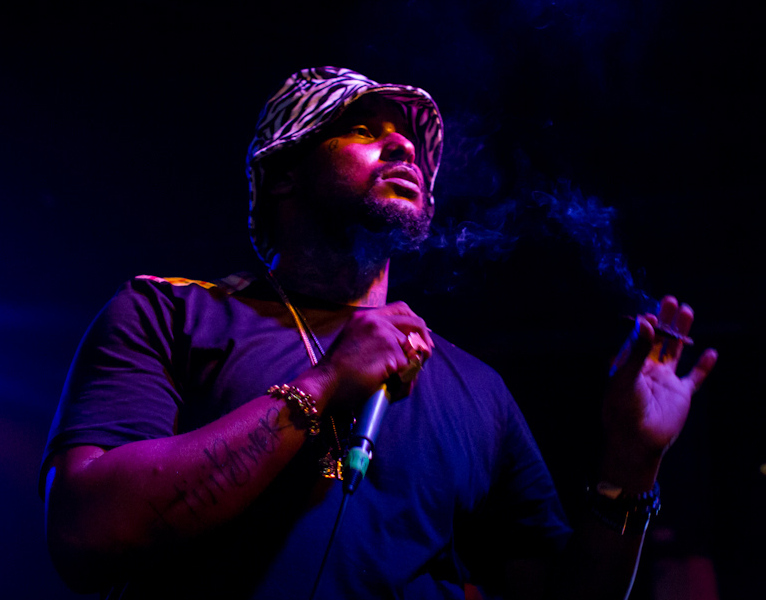
- Schoolboy Q in July 2012
- Studio albums: 6
- Singles: 30
- Music videos: 36
- Mixtapes: 2

American rapper Schoolboy Q has released six studio albums, two mixtapes, 30 singles (including 14 as a featured artist), and 36 music videos.

== Studio albums ==
List of albums, with selected chart positions
Title	Album details	Peak chart positions										Sales	Certifications
Title	Album details	US	US R&B/HH	US Rap	AUS	CAN	FRA	GER	NZ	SWI	UK	Sales	Certifications
Setbacks	Released: January 11, 2011; Label: Top Dawg; Format: Digital download	100	25	12	—	—	—	—	—	—	—	US: 18,000 (as of 2014)	
Habits & Contradictions	Released: January 14, 2012; Label: Top Dawg; Format: Digital download	111	25	16	—	—	—	—	—	—	—	US: 48,000 (as of 2014)	
Oxymoron	Released: February 25, 2014; Label: Top Dawg, Interscope; Format: CD, LP, digital download, streaming	1	1	1	11	1	123	59	7	24	23		RIAA: 2× Platinum; BPI: Silver; RMNZ: 2× Platinum
Blank Face LP	Released: July 8, 2016; Label: Top Dawg, Interscope; Format: CD, LP, digital download, streaming	2	1	1	9	2	87	73	5	14	36		RIAA: Gold; RMNZ: Gold
Crash Talk	Released: April 26, 2019; Label: Top Dawg, Interscope; Format: CD, LP, digital download, streaming	3	1	1	11	5	50	47	6	17	27		RIAA: Gold
Blue Lips	Released: March 1, 2024; Label: Top Dawg Entertainment, Interscope; Format: CD, LP, digital download, streaming	13	6	5	72	33	128	—	18	26	—		
"—" denotes a title that did not chart, or was not released in that territory.

| Thank Que | * Label: Top Dawg Entertainment,Interscope Records

- Format: CD,LP

== Mixtapes ==
List of albums, with selected details
Title	Album details
ScHoolboy Turned Hustla	Released: July 18, 2008; Format: Free download; Label: G.E.D. Inc
Gangsta & Soul	Released: May 14, 2009; Format: Free download; Label: G.E.D. Inc, Top Dawg Entertainment

== Singles ==
=== As lead artist ===
List of singles as lead artist, with selected chart positions and certifications, showing year released and album name
Title	Year	Peak chart positions							Certifications	Album
Title	Year	US	US R&B/HH	US Rap	BEL (FL) Urb.	CAN	NZ	UK	Certifications	Album
"Druggy's wit Hoes Again" (featuring Ab-Soul)	2012	—	—	—	—	—	—	—		Habits & Contradictions
"Hands on tHe WHeel" (featuring ASAP Rocky)	2012	—	— (Note: "Hands on the Wheel" did not enter the Billboard Hot R&B/Hip-Hop Songs chart, but peaked at number five on the Bubbling Under R&B/Hip-Hop Singles chart.)	—	—	—	—	—	RIAA: Gold; RMNZ: Platinum	Habits & Contradictions
"Yay Yay"	2013	—	49	—	—	—	—	—		Oxymoron
"Collard Greens" (featuring Kendrick Lamar)	2013	92	28	21	—	—	—	184	RIAA: 5× Platinum; BPI: Gold; RMNZ: 3× Platinum	Oxymoron
"Man of tHe Year"	2013	62	16	7	—	—	—	—	RIAA: 3× Platinum; BPI: Silver; RMNZ: 2× Platinum	Oxymoron
"Break tHe Bank"	2014	— (Note: "Break the Bank" did not enter the Billboard Hot 100, but peaked at number 15 on the Bubbling Under Hot 100 chart.)	32	16	—	—	—	—	RIAA: Gold	Oxymoron
"Studio" (featuring BJ The CHicago Kid)	2014	38	10	5	46	—	—	—	RIAA: 3× Platinum; RMNZ: 2× Platinum	Oxymoron
"Hell of a NigHt"	2014	—	46	—	—	—	—	—	RIAA: Gold; RMNZ: Gold	Oxymoron
"Groovy Tony"	2016	—	—	—	—	—	—	—		Blank Face LP
"THat Part" (featuring Kanye West)	2016	40	13	8	—	51	— (Note: "THat Part" did not enter the NZ Top 40 Singles Chart, but peaked at number six on the NZ Heatseeker Singles chart.)	—	RIAA: 3× Platinum; RMNZ: Platinum	Blank Face LP
"Overtime" (featuring Miguel and Justine Skye)	2016	—	50	—	—	—	—			Blank Face LP
"Kill 'Em witH Success" (with Eearz, 2 CHainz, and Mike WiLL Made-It)	2018	—	—	—	—	—	—	—		Creed II (Soundtrack)
"Numb Numb Juice"	2019	55	25	23	—	55	32	—	RIAA: Platinum; RMNZ: Gold	Crash Talk
"CHopstix" (with Travis Scott)	2019	85	32	—	—	69	— (Note: "CHopstix" did not enter the NZ Top 40 Singles Chart, but peaked at number seven on the NZ Hot Singles Chart.)	—	RIAA: Gold	Crash Talk
"Floating" (featuring 21 Savage)	2019	67	25	22	89	56	— (Note: "Floating" did not enter the NZ Top 40 Singles Chart, but peaked at number five on the NZ Hot Singles Chart.)	—	RIAA: Platinum; RMNZ: Gold	Crash Talk
"Soccer Dad"	2022	—	—	—	—	—	—	—		Non-album single
"Yeern 101"	2024	— (Note: "Yeern 101" did not enter the Billboard Hot 100, but peaked at number 25 on the Bubbling Under Hot 100 chart.)	—	—	—	—	— (Note: "Yeern 101" did not enter the NZ Top 40 Singles Chart, but peaked at number 32 on the NZ Hot Singles Chart.)	—		Blue Lips
"—" denotes a recording that did not chart, or was not released in that territory.

=== As featured artist ===
List of singles as featured artist, with selected chart positions and certifications, showing year released and album name
Title	Year	Peak chart positions										Certifications	Album
Title	Year	US	US R&B/HH	US Rap	AUS	CAN	FRA	GER	NZ	SWI	UK	Certifications	Album
"Flight Confirmation" (The Alchemist featuring Danny Brown and ScHoolboy Q)	2012	—	—	—	—	—	—	—	—	—	—		Russian Roulette
"Kidz with Gunz" (Skeme featuring ScHoolboy Q)	2012	—	—	—	—	—	—	—	—	—	—		Alive & Living
"Work" (Remix) (ASAP Ferg featuring ASAP Rocky, French Montana, Trinidad James and ScHoolboy Q)	2013	—	—	—	—	—	—	—	—	—	—	RIAA: 3× Platinum	Trap Lord
"All My Niggas" (E-40 featuring Danny Brown and ScHoolboy Q)	2013	—	—	—	—	—	—	—	—	—	—		The Block Brochure: Welcome to the Soil 5
"White Walls" (Macklemore & Ryan Lewis featuring ScHoolboy Q and Hollis)	2013	15	3	3	34	17	65	17	6	32	26	RIAA: 2× Platinum; ARIA: Platinum; BPI: Silver; RMNZ: 2× Platinum	The Heist
"2 On" (Tinashe featuring ScHoolboy Q)	2014	24	5	—	29	74	180	—	—	—	127	RIAA: 4× Platinum; ARIA: Platinum; BPI: Platinum; MC: Gold; RMNZ: 3× Platinum	Aquarius
"The Illest" (Remix) (Far East Movement featuring ScHoolboy Q)	2014	—	—	—	—	—	—	—	—	—	—		non-album single
"It's True" (BJ the Chicago Kid featuring ScHoolboy Q)	2014	—	—	—	—	—	—	—	—	—	—		The M.A.F.E. Project
"Bitches N Marijuana" (Chris Brown and Tyga featuring ScHoolboy Q)	2015	— (Note: "Bitches N Marijuana" did not enter the Billboard Hot 100, but peaked at number three on the Bubbling Under Hot 100 Singles chart.)	33	20	49	—	139	50	—	—	60	RIAA: Gold; BPI: Silver; RMNZ: Platinum	Fan of a Fan: The Album
"Am I Wrong?" (Anderson Paak featuring ScHoolboy Q)	2015	—	—	—	—	—	152	—	—	—	—	RIAA: Gold; RMNZ: Gold	Malibu
"California Heaven" (JAHKOY featuring ScHoolboy Q)	2016	—	—	—	—	—	—	—	—	—	—		Foreign Water
"Rockabye Baby" (Joey Badass featuring ScHoolboy Q)	2017	— (Note: "Rockabye Baby" did not enter the Billboard Hot 100, but peaked at number ten on the Bubbling Under Hot 100 Singles chart.)	50	—	97	87	—	—	—	—	—		All-Amerikkkan Badass
"Movin' Around" (Cyhi the Prynce featuring ScHoolboy Q)	2017	—	—	—	—	—	—	—	—	—	—		No Dope on Sundays
"Chase The Money" (E-40 featuring Quavo, Roddy Ricch, ASAP Ferg and ScHoolboy Q)	2019	—	—	—	—	—	—	—	—	—	—		Practice Makes Paper
"Pac-Man" (Gorillaz featuring Schoolboy Q)	2020	—	—	—	—	—	—	—	—	—	—		Song Machine, Season One: Strange Timez
"Gang Signs" (Freddie Gibbs featuring Schoolboy Q)	2021	—	—	—	—	—	—	—	—	—	—		$oul $old $eparately (Deluxe)
"—" denotes a recording that did not chart or was not released in that territory.

== Other charted songs ==
List of songs, with selected chart positions and certifications, showing year released and album name
Title	Year	Peak chart positions									Certifications	Album
Title	Year	US	US R&B/HH	US Rap	AUS	CAN	IRE	NZ	SWI	UK	Certifications	Album
"PMW (All I Really Need)" (ASAP Rocky featuring ScHoolboy Q)	2013	— (Note: "PMW (All I Really Need)" did not enter the Billboard Hot 100, but peaked at number 14 on the Bubbling Under Hot 100 Singles chart.)	39	—	—	—	—	—	—	—	RIAA: Gold	Long. Live. ASAP
"WHat THey Want" (featuring 2 CHainz)	2014	—	— (Note: "What They Want" did not enter the Billboard Hot R&B/Hip-Hop Songs chart, but peaked at number four on the Bubbling Under R&B/Hip-Hop Singles chart.)	—	—	—	—	—	—	—	RIAA: Gold	Oxymoron
"THe Purge" (featuring Tyler, The Creator and Kurupt)	2014	—	— (Note: "The Purge" did not enter the Billboard Hot R&B/Hip-Hop Songs chart, but peaked at number nine on the Bubbling Under R&B/Hip-Hop Singles chart.)	—	—	—	—	—	—	—		Oxymoron
"I Just Wanna Party" (YG featuring ScHoolboy Q and Jay Rock)	2014	—	— (Note: "I Just Wanna Party" did not enter the Billboard Hot R&B/Hip-Hop Songs chart, but peaked at number six on the Bubbling Under R&B/Hip-Hop Singles chart.)	—	—	—	—	—	—	—		My Krazy Life
"Electric Body" (ASAP Rocky featuring ScHoolboy Q)	2015	80	27	21	—	—	—	—	—	—	RIAA: Platinum; RMNZ: Gold	At. Long. Last. ASAP
"Let it Bang" (ASAP Ferg featuring ScHoolboy Q)	2016	—	— (Note: "Let It Bang" did not enter the Billboard Hot R&B/Hip-Hop Songs chart, but peaked at number one on the Bubbling Under R&B/Hip-Hop Singles chart.)	—	—	—	—	—	—	—		Always Strive and Prosper
"By Any Means"	2016	—	— (Note: "By Any Means" did not enter the Billboard Hot R&B/Hip-Hop Songs chart, but peaked at number seven on the Bubbling Under R&B/Hip-Hop Singles chart.)	—	—	—	—	— (Note: "By Any Means" did not enter the NZ Top 40 Singles Chart, but peaked at number eight on the NZ Heatseeker Singles Chart.)	—	—		Blank Face LP
"Cash Out" (Calvin Harris featuring ScHoolboy Q, PartyNextDoor and DRAM)	2017	—	— (Note: "Cash Out" did not enter the Billboard Hot R&B/Hip-Hop Songs chart, but peaked at number six on the Bubbling Under R&B/Hip-Hop Singles chart.)	—	—	94	67	— (Note: "Cash Out" did not enter the NZ Top 40 Singles Chart, but peaked at number one on the NZ Heatseeker Singles Chart.)	—	—		Funk Wav Bounces Vol. 1
"X" (with 2 Chainz and Saudi)	2018	49	25	21	—	41	—	— (Note: "X" did not enter the NZ Top 40 Singles Chart, but peaked at number two on the NZ Heatseeker Singles Chart.)	77	45	RIAA: Platinum; RMNZ: Gold	Black Panther: The Album
"Lies" (featuring Ty Dolla Sign and YG)	2019	—	—	—	—	—	—	— (Note: "Lies" did not enter the NZ Top 40 Singles Chart, but peaked at number 14 on the NZ Hot Singles Chart.)	—	—		CrasH Talk
"5200"	2019	—	—	—	—	—	—	— (Note: "5200" did not enter the NZ Top 40 Singles Chart, but peaked at number 10 on the NZ Hot Singles Chart.)	—	—		CrasH Talk
"CrasH"	2019	—	46	—	—	—	—	— (Note: "Crash" did not enter the NZ Top 40 Singles Chart, but peaked at number seven on the NZ Hot Singles Chart.)	—	—	RIAA: Gold; RMNZ: Gold	CrasH Talk
"Water" (featuring Lil Baby)	2019	—	49	—	—	—	—	—	—	—		CrasH Talk
"Pop" (featuring Rico Nasty)	2024	—	—	—	—	—	—	— (Note: "Pop" did not enter the NZ Top 40 Singles Chart, but peaked at number 14 on the NZ Hot Singles Chart.)	—	—		Blue Lips
"Thank God 4 Me"	2024	— (Note: "Thank God 4 Me" did not enter the Billboard Hot 100, but peaked at number 10 on the Bubbling Under Hot 100 chart.)	39	—	—	—	—	— (Note: "Thank God 4 Me" did not enter the NZ Top 40 Singles Chart, but peaked at number 11 on the NZ Hot Singles Chart.)	—	—		Blue Lips
"Blueslides"	2024	—	—	—	—	—	—	— (Note: "Blueslides" did not enter the NZ Top 40 Singles Chart, but peaked at number 15 on the NZ Hot Singles Chart.)	—	—		Blue Lips
"Ohio" (featuring Freddie Gibbs)	2024	—	—	—	—	—	—	— (Note: "Ohio" did not enter the NZ Top 40 Singles Chart, but peaked at number 12 on the NZ Hot Singles Chart.)	—	—		Blue Lips
"—" denotes a recording that did not chart.

== Guest appearances ==
List of non-single guest appearances, with other performing artists, showing year released and album name
Title	Year	Other artist(s)	Album
"Cuts Up"	2009	Tyga	Outraged & Underage
"Smoke Chronic"	2009	Jay Rock, Spider Loc	30 Day Takeover
"I'm a G"	2009	Ab-Soul, Glasses Malone	Longterm
"There They Go"	2009	Boo-Bonic, Rich Hil	The Curious Case of Boo Bonic
"Far from Here"	2009	Kendrick Lamar	The Kendrick Lamar EP
"Pass the Blunt"	2010	Ab-Soul	Longterm 2: Lifestyles of the Broke and Almost Famous
"Michael Jordan"	2010	Kendrick Lamar	Overly Dedicated
"El Camp 2"	2010	Tae Beast, Ab-Soul, Kendrick Lamar	TheTaeBeastTape
"Loaded" (Remix)	2011	Smoke DZA	none
"This is 4Da"	2011	Be-1, Skeme	Eulogy
"The Spiteful Chant"	2011	Kendrick Lamar	Section.80
"Hell Yeah"	2011	Ab-Soul	Longterm Mentality
"Overhigh"	2011	Smoke DZA, Trademark da Skydiver	Rolling Stoned
"Tye Dye Everything"	2011	Mod Sun	Blazed By the Bell
"Beats, Hoes and Rhymes"	2011	Dom Kennedy, Casey Veggies	From the Westside with Love, II
"May 31st"	2011	Aston Matthews	NOFVCKSGIVEN
"This Is Me"	2011	Fas Action	I Trust Me
"Brand New Guy"	2011	ASAP Rocky	Live. Love. ASAP
"Get into the Moment"	2011	Kid Ink	none
"Rap Shit"	2012	Problem, Casey Veggies, Murs, Ab-Soul, Skeme, Terrace Martin	Swig Tape Volume.1
"Warrior"	2012	Erreon Lee	The Surface
"SOPA"	2012	Ab-Soul	Control System
"Ashtray"	2012	Smoke DZA, Domo Genesis	Rugby Thompson
"AaaHH! Real Monsters"	2012	XV, B.o.B	Popular Culture
"What You Call That?!"	2012	Quiz, One-2, Niqle Nut	Treacherous Records Presents: The Mint Room
"Unnecessary"	2012	Childish Gambino, Ab-Soul	Royalty
"Can I Speak to You"	2012	50 Cent	5 (Murder by Numbers)
"Gettin' By"	2012	Lloyd Banks	V.6: The Gift
"Food Savers & Scissors"	2012	CyHi the Prynce	Ivy League Club
"Love Me Not"	2012	TiRon	The Cafeteria Line Presents HNGRY
"Fair Fight"	2012	Strong Arm Steady, Ab-Soul, Jay Rock	Stereotype
"PlaneCarBoat"	2012	Mac Miller	none
"I'm Not in Love"	2012	Mike Will Made It, Yung Joey	Est. in 1989 Pt. 2 and Along Came Molly
"Highway to Hell"	2012	DJ Kay Slay, Kendrick Lamar, Jay Rock	The Return of the Gate Keeper
"Ruthless"	2012	Curtains	23
"America"	2012	Boaz	Bases Loaded
"Same Ol’ Story"	2012	DJ Drama, Kid Ink, Cory Gunz, Childish Gambino	Quality Street Music
"Demolition Men"	2012	Action Bronson, The Alchemist	Rare Chandeliers
"Cypher"	2013	HS87, Casey Veggies, Xzibit, Rick Ross, Method Man, Redman, Raekwon	All I’ve Ever Dreamed Of
"Hit Em Up"	2013	Funkmaster Flex	Who You Mad At? Me or Yourself?
"PMW (All I Really Need)"	2013	ASAP Rocky	Long. Live. ASAP
"Back Then"	2013	Ab-Soul	DJ Drama Presents: XXL 2013's Freshmen Class
"She Like"	2013	none	DJ Drama Presents: XXL 2013's Freshmen Class
"Gees"	2013	Mac Miller	Watching Movies with the Sound Off
"Back Sellin’ Crack"	2013	Vince Staples	Stolen Youth
"NineteenEighty7"	2013	Stalley	Honest Cowboy
"Streets Luv Me"	2013	Bonic, Troy Ave	Bonic
"Dope Fiend Rental"	2013	Danny Brown	Old
"Astronaut Pussy / Welcome to California"	2013	The Game, Skeme, Stacy Barthe, Too Short	OKE: Operation Kill Everything
"Shit" (Megamix)	2013	Mike Will Made It, Future, Drake, Jeezy, T.I., Juicy J, Diddy, Pastor Troy	#MikeWillBeenTrill
"Shot You Down" (Remix)	2014	Isaiah Rashad, Jay Rock	Cilvia Demo
"Hunnid Stax"	2014	Ab-Soul	These Days...
"Friends"	2014	Mac Miller	Faces
"I Just Wanna Party"	2014	YG, Jay Rock	My Krazy Life
"Flip on You"	2014	50 Cent	Animal Ambition
"Latch (Remix)"	2014	Disclosure, Sam Smith	none
"Drop That Bitch"	2014	Salva, Kurupt, Problem, Bad Lucc	Peacemaker
"Melt"	2014	Mac Miller	none
"We Dem Boyz" (Remix)	2014	Wiz Khalifa, Rick Ross, Nas	Blacc Hollywood
"Often" (Remix)	2014	The Weeknd, Rick Ross	none
"Underground Kings"	2014	Royce da 5'9", DJ Premier, Killer Mike	PRhyme
"Run"	2015	Ne-Yo	Non-Fiction
"Run"	2015	Tyler, The Creator, Toro y Moi	Cherry Bomb
"The Brown Stains of Darkeese Latifah Part 6-12 (Remix)"	2015	Tyler, The Creator	Cherry Bomb
"Electric Body"	2015	ASAP Rocky	At. Long. Last. ASAP
"OK Alright"	2015	Travis Scott	Rodeo
"Gang Bang Anyway"	2015	The Game, Jay Rock	The Documentary 2.5
"In the Bag"	2015	Mac Miller, Domo Genesis, Juicy J	GO:OD AM
"6 Shots"	2015	Watch The Duck, Candice Pillay	The Trojan Horse
"Let It Bang"	2016	ASAP Ferg	Always Strive and Prosper
"The Chill"	2016	Mistah F.A.B.	Son of a Pimp Part 2
"Beat the Case /// Straight Crooked"	2016	Ab-Soul	Do What Thou Wilt.
"Hennebeeto"	2017	RJ	MrLA
"Table"	2017	Styles P, Berner	Vibes
"Cash Out"	2017	Calvin Harris, PartyNextDoor, DRAM	Funk Wav Bounces Vol. 1
"Bahamas"	2017	ASAP Rocky, ASAP Ferg, ASAP Twelvyy, Lil Yachty, Key!, Smooky Margielaa	Cozy Tapes Vol. 2: Too Cozy
"Lil Story"	2017	Gucci Mane	Mr. Davis
"Somethin' Foreign"	2018	Sir	November
"Code of Honor"	2018	DJ Esco. Future	Kolorblind
"X"	2018	2 Chainz, Saudi	Black Panther (soundtrack)
"Don't Shoot"	2018	Too Short, Joyner Lucas	The Pimp Tape
"Good Day"	2018	21 Savage, Project Pat	I Am > I Was
"Won't Believe"	2019	Higher Brothers	Five Stars
"On One"	2019	RJmrLA	On God
"3AM"	2019	Maxo Kream	Brandon
"Steak Um"	2020	Black Thought	Streams of Thought, Vol. 3: Cane & Able
"Covid Cough"	2020	Roc Marciano	Mt. Marci
"Shoot Sideways"	2020	Conway the Machine, The Alchemist	Lulu
"Blacks N Mexicans"	2021	Ty Dolla Sign, B-Real	Gully (Original Motion Picture Soundtrack)
"Disrespectful (Remix)"	2021	Childish Major	Thank You, God. For It All.
"Runnin'"	2021	Isaiah Rashad	none
"Cutlass"	2022	AUGUST 8	Towards The Sun
"Clip in a Tray"	2022	The Alchemist	The Alchemist Sandwich
"Hooty"	2023	T.F	Feelin the Power
"Pop Out"	2023	Larry June, Cardo	The Night Shift
"Fork in the Pot"	2023	Westside Gunn, Conway the Machine, The Alchemist	Hall & Nash 2
"Pressured Up"	2024	Mustard, Vince Staples	Faith of a Mustard Seed
"Ferraris in the Rain"	2024	The Alchemist	The Genuine Articulate
"Sage"	2024	Rome Streetz	Hatton Garden Holdup
"Bang Your Head"	2024	Devin Malik	DEADSTOCK
"Thought I Was Dead"	2024	Tyler, the Creator	Chromakopia

== Music videos ==
=== As main artist ===
List of music videos, showing year released and director
Title	Year	Director(s)
"Take the Pain Away"	2009	Justin Rev Barnes
"Live Again" (with Kendrick Lamar and Curtains)	2010	Fredo Tovar, Scott Fleishman
"What's Tha Word" (featuring Jay Rock and Ab-Soul)	2010	Matt Plunkett
"Phenomenon" (featuring Alori Joh)	2011	Fredo Tovar
"Druggys wit Hoes" (featuring Ab-Soul)	2011	Ramses Perryman
"Fantasy" (featuring Jhené Aiko)	2011	Jerome D. Hurd
"Sacrilegious"	2011	Jerome D. Hurd
"Hands on the Wheel" (featuring ASAP Rocky)	2012	Jerome D. Hurd
"Nightmare on Figg St."	2012	Jerome D. Hurd
"Druggys wit Hoes Again" (featuring Ab-Soul)	2012	Jerome D. Hurd
"There He Go"	2012	David M. Helman
"Collard Greens" (featuring Kendrick Lamar)	2013	Jerome D. Hurd
"Banger (MOSHPIT)"	2013	Jerome D. Hurd
"Man of the Year"	2014	Dave Free, Fredo Tovar, Scott Fleishman
"Break the Bank"	2014	Jason Goldwatch
"Studio" (featuring BJ the Chicago Kid)	2014	Jerome D. Hurd
"Hoover Street"	2014	Lan "Yellow" Nguyen, Moosa
"Hell of a Night"	2014	Jon Jon Augustavo
"Groovy Tony"	2016	Jack Begert, the Little Homies
"THat Part" (featuring Kanye West)	2016	Colin Tilley
"Tookie Knows II" (featuring Traffic and TF)	2016	Jack Begert
"Dope Dealer" (featuring E-40)	2016	Ryan Staake
"Overtime" (featuring Miguel and Justine Skye)	2016	Jack Begert, Dave Free
"Kill 'Em with Success" (with Eearz, Mike Will Made-It & 2 Chainz)	2018	—N/a
"Numb Numb Juice"	2019	Dave Free, Jack Begert
"Chopstix" (with Travis Scott)	2019	Nabil Elderkin
"Floating" (featuring 21 Savage)	2019	Dave Free, Jack Begert
"Dangerous" (featuring Kid Cudi)	2019	Alexandre Moors

=== As featured artist ===
List of music videos, showing year released and director
Title	Year	Director(s)
"Michael Jordan" (Kendrick Lamar featuring Schoolboy Q)	2010	Fredo Tovar
"Say Wassup" (Jay Rock featuring Ab-Soul, Schoolboy Q and Kendrick Lamar)	2011	Fredo Tovar
"Tye Dye Everything" (Mod Sun featuring Schoolboy Q)	2011	Mod Sun
"Brand New Guy" (ASAP Rocky featuring Schoolboy Q)	2012	The ICU, ASAP Rocky
"Flight Confirmation" (The Alchemist featuring Danny Brown and Schoolboy Q)	2012	Jason Goldwatch
"Black Lip Bastard (Remix)" (Ab-Soul featuring Kendrick Lamar, Schoolboy Q and Jay Rock)	2012	The ICU
"Ruthless" (Curtains featuring Schoolboy Q)	2012	Awol Erizku
"Work (Remix)" (ASAP Ferg featuring ASAP Rocky, French Montana, Trinidad James and Schoolboy Q)	2013	—N/a
"Gees" (Mac Miller featuring Schoolboy Q)	2013	Illroots, Illamerica
"NineteenEighty7" (Stalley featuring Schoolboy Q)	2013	John Colombo
"All My Niggas" (E-40 featuring Danny Brown and Schoolboy Q)	2013	Ben Griffin
"White Walls" (Macklemore & Ryan Lewis featuring Hollis and Schoolboy Q)	2013	Macklemore, Ryan Lewis, Jason Koenig
"2 On" (Tinashe featuring Schoolboy Q)	2014	Hannah Lux Davis
"Hunnid Stax" (Ab-Soul featuring Schoolboy Q)	2014	Adam Roberts
"It's True" (BJ the Chicago Kid featuring Schoolboy Q)	2014	Verluxe
"Bitches n Marijuana" (Chris Brown & Tyga featuring ScHoolboy Q)	2015	—N/a
"Let It Bang" (A$AP Ferg featuring ScHoolboy Q)	—N/a	
"Chase the Money" (E-40 featuring Quavo, Roddy Ricch, ASAP Ferg and ScHoolboy Q)	2019	Ben Griffin
"PAC-MAN" (Gorillaz featuring ScHoolboy Q)	2020	—N/a
"Runnin" (Isaiah Rashad featuring ScHoolboy Q)	—N/a	2021
"Gang Signs" (Freddie Gibbs featuring ScHoolboy Q)	Aaron Hymes	2021
"Ferraris in the Rain" (The Alchemist featuring ScHoolboy Q)	2024	New High Filmz

== See also ==
- Black Hippy discography
