= Kendrick Lamar singles discography =

Singles recorded by American rapper

- Lamar performing in 2017
- Singles: 73
- Promotional singles: 5
- Other charted songs: 48

The American rapper Kendrick Lamar has released 73 singles and five promotional singles. Thirty of those singles were as a lead artist, while forty-three were as a featured artist. According to the Recording Industry Association of America (RIAA), Lamar's digital singles registered 41 million certified units, based on sales and on-demand streaming, as of June 2024. Lamar's US Billboard Hot 100 chart stats as of March 28, 2025, read: 6 number-one songs, 90 total chart entries, 60 top-forty entries, 40 top-twenty entries, 23 top-ten entries, 17 top-ten debuts, 14 top-five entries, and three number-one debuts.

Lamar's debut studio album Section.80 (2011) failed to produce any commercially successful singles. His first showing on international record and radio airplay charts came with his succeeding efforts, Good Kid, M.A.A.D City (2012) and To Pimp a Butterfly (2015). "Swimming Pools (Drank)", the lead single from the former album, marked Lamar's first entry on the US Billboard Hot 100 and the UK Singles Chart. Good Kid, M.A.A.D City also contained the moderately successful singles "The Recipe", "Poetic Justice", "Backseat Freestyle", and "Bitch, Don't Kill My Vibe". To Pimp a Butterfly was supported by five singles—"I" (which reached the top 40 in the U.S. and several European countries), "The Blacker the Berry", "King Kunta", "Alright", and "These Walls". Lamar's remix of Taylor Swift's single "Bad Blood" marked his first number-one song in Australia, Canada, New Zealand, Scotland, and the U.S.

With his fourth studio album Damn (2017), Lamar became the fifth artist in history to chart at least 14 concurrent titles on the Billboard Hot 100. The album was preceded by "Humble", Lamar's second number-one track (and first as a lead artist) in New Zealand and the U.S. The International Federation of the Phonographic Industry (IFPI) declared the single as the sixth best-selling song of 2017. Further bolstered by the international top 20 singles "Loyalty" and "Love", Damn became the first album by a rapper or solo artist to have every song featured be certified gold or higher by the RIAA. All eighteen tracks from Lamar's fifth studio album, Mr. Morale & the Big Steppers (2022), charted on the Billboard Hot 100; its successful singles comprise "The Heart Part 5", "N95", "Silent Hill", and "Die Hard".

During his 2024 feud with Drake, Lamar released five commercially successful diss records. Two of them, "Like That" and "Not Like Us", debuted atop the American, Canadian, and South African charts. All twelve tracks from Lamar's sixth studio album: GNX (2024), charted within the top-thirty of the US Billboard Hot 100 with seven tracks appearing in the top-ten—occupying the entire top-five. "Squabble Up", the second track from GNX, debuted atop the Billboard Hot 100 and gave Lamar his third number one song on the chart of 2024 — causing him to become the first male solo artist to have three number-one-debuts in the same year. "Luther", a track that features SZA and appears on GNX would later peak atop the respective chart.

Lamar has worked with numerous artists on collaborative singles. His most successful endeavors include ASAP Rocky's "Fuckin' Problems" (2012), Robin Thicke's "Give It 2 U" (2013), Maroon 5's "Don't Wanna Know", and Travis Scott's "Goosebumps" (both 2016). Black Panther: The Album (2018), Lamar's soundtrack album for the film of the same name, produced the international top 10 singles "All the Stars", "King's Dead", and "Pray for Me".

== As lead artist ==
=== 2010s ===
List of singles released in the 2010s decade, with selected chart positions, certifications, and associated albums
Title	Year	Peak chart positions										Certifications	Album
Title	Year	US	US R&B /HH	US Rap	AUS	BEL (FL)	CAN	FRA	NZ	SWE	UK	Certifications	Album
"HiiiPower"	2011	—	—	—	—	—	—	—	—	—	—	RMNZ: Gold	Section.80
"The Recipe" (featuring Dr. Dre)	2012	— (Note: "The Recipe" did not enter the Billboard Hot 100, but peaked at number three on the Bubbling Under Hot 100 Singles chart, which acts as an extension to the Hot 100.)	38	23	—	—	—	—	—	—	—	RIAA: Platinum; ARIA: Platinum; BPI: Silver; MC: 2× Platinum; RMNZ: Platinum	Good Kid, M.A.A.D City
"Swimming Pools (Drank)"	2012	17	3	3	67	— (Note: "Swimming Pools (Drank)" did not enter the Flanders Ultratop 50, but peaked at number 19 on the Ultratip chart.)	99	59	—	—	57	RIAA: 4× Platinum; ARIA: 8× Platinum; BPI: 2× Platinum; MC: 6× Platinum; RMNZ: 6× Platinum	Good Kid, M.A.A.D City
"Backseat Freestyle"	2013	— (Note: "Backseat Freestyle" did not enter the Billboard Hot 100, but peaked at number six on the Bubbling Under Hot 100 Singles chart.)	29	22	—	— (Note: "Backseat Freestyle" did not enter the Flanders Ultratop 50, but peaked at number 81 on the Ultratip chart.)	—	—	—	—	79	RIAA: Platinum; ARIA: 2× Platinum; BPI: Gold; RMNZ: 2× Platinum	Good Kid, M.A.A.D City
"Poetic Justice" (featuring Drake)	2013	26	8	6	—	— (Note: "Poetic Justice" did not enter the Flanders Ultratop 50, but peaked at number 56 on the Ultratip chart.)	—	—	—	—	—	RIAA: 2× Platinum; ARIA: 2× Platinum; BPI: Gold; RMNZ: 3× Platinum	Good Kid, M.A.A.D City
"Bitch, Don't Kill My Vibe" (solo, remix featuring Jay-Z or Emeli Sandé remix)	2013	32	9	7	—	—	—	—	—	—	—	RIAA: 4× Platinum; ARIA: 4× Platinum (Note: Emeli Sandé remix); BPI: Platinum; MC: 3× Platinum; RMNZ: 4× Platinum	Good Kid, M.A.A.D City
"I"	2014	39	11	8	48	— (Note: "I" did not enter the Flanders Ultratop 50, but peaked at number 22 on the Ultratip chart.)	61	68	31	—	20	RIAA: Platinum; ARIA: 2× Platinum; BPI: Gold; MC: Platinum; RMNZ: Platinum	To Pimp a Butterfly
"The Blacker the Berry"	2015	66	25	16	—	— (Note: "The Blacker the Berry" did not enter the Flanders Ultratop 50, but peaked at number 87 on the Ultratip chart.)	—	—	—	—	83	RIAA: Gold; ARIA: Gold; MC: Gold; RMNZ: Gold	To Pimp a Butterfly
"King Kunta"	2015	58	20	11	32	15	52	80	24	90	56	RIAA: Platinum; ARIA: 7× Platinum; BPI: Platinum; BRMA: Gold; MC: 4× Platinum; RMNZ: 5× Platinum	To Pimp a Butterfly
"Alright"	2015	81	24	20	—	—	—	—	—	—	—	RIAA: Platinum; ARIA: 3× Platinum; BPI: Platinum; MC: 2× Platinum; RMNZ: 3× Platinum	To Pimp a Butterfly
"These Walls" (featuring Bilal, Anna Wise and Thundercat)	2015	94	34	25	—	—	—	—	—	—	77	ARIA: Platinum; BPI: Silver; MC: Gold; RMNZ: Gold	To Pimp a Butterfly
"Untitled 07 | Levitate"	2016	90	27	16	—	—	—	197	—	—	93	RMNZ: Gold	Untitled Unmastered
"Humble"	2017	1	1	1	2	15	2	11	1	10	6	RIAA: 7× Platinum; ARIA: 14× Platinum; BPI: 3× Platinum; BRMA: Platinum; IFPI SWE: Platinum; MC: Diamond; RMNZ: 11× Platinum; SNEP: Diamond	Damn
"Loyalty" (featuring Rihanna)	2017	14	7	6	20	— (Note: "Loyalty" did not enter the Flanders Ultratop 50, but peaked at number 30 on the Ultratip chart.)	12	43	15	34	27	RIAA: 2× Platinum; ARIA: 3× Platinum; BPI: Platinum; MC: 3× Platinum; RMNZ: 3× Platinum; SNEP: Gold	Damn
"Love" (featuring Zacari)	2017	11	6	5	29	— (Note: "Love" did not enter the Flanders Ultratop 50, but charted as an "extra tip" on the Ultratip chart.)	22	88	24	58	39	RIAA: 4× Platinum; ARIA: 7× Platinum; BPI: Platinum; MC: 5× Platinum; RMNZ: 6× Platinum; SNEP: Platinum	Damn
"All the Stars" (with SZA)	2018	7	5	—	2	21	7	21	2	7	5	RIAA: 2× Platinum; ARIA: 13× Platinum; BPI: 4× Platinum; BRMA: Gold; IFPI SWE: Platinum; MC: 6× Platinum; RMNZ: 9× Platinum; SNEP: Diamond	Black Panther: The Album
"King's Dead" (with Jay Rock, Future and James Blake)	2018	21	13	10	58	— (Note: "King's Dead" did not enter the Flanders Ultratop 50, but charted as an "extra tip" on the Ultratip chart.)	23	—	— (Note: "King's Dead" did not enter the NZ Top 40 Singles Chart, but peaked at number four on the NZ Heatseeker Singles Chart.)	— (Note: "King's Dead" did not enter the Swedish Singellista Chart, but peaked at number one on the Swedish Heatseeker Chart.)	50	RIAA: 4× Platinum; BPI: Gold; MC: 3× Platinum; RMNZ: 2× Platinum	Black Panther: The Album
"Pray for Me" (with the Weeknd)	2018	7	4	—	9	22	5	14	12	4	11	RIAA: 2× Platinum; ARIA: 4× Platinum; BPI: Platinum; IFPI SWE: Platinum; MC: 5× Platinum; RMNZ: 2× Platinum; SNEP: Diamond	Black Panther: The Album
"—" denotes a recording that did not chart or was not released in that territory.

=== 2020s ===
List of singles released in the 2020s decade, with selected chart positions, certifications, and associated albums
Title	Year	Peak chart positions										Certifications	Album
Title	Year	US	US R&B /HH	US Rap	AUS	CAN	FRA	NZ	SWE	UK	WW	Certifications	Album
"Family Ties" (with Baby Keem)	2021	18	8	8	44	19	—	29	— (Note: "Family Ties" did not enter the Swedish Singellista Chart, but peaked at number 12 on the Swedish Heatseeker Chart.)	52	25	RIAA: 6× Platinum; BPI: Platinum; MC: 2× Platinum; RMNZ: 2× Platinum; SNEP: Gold	The Melodic Blue
"N95"	2022	3	2	2	3	2	24	2	22	6	2	ARIA: 2× Platinum; BPI: Silver; RMNZ: Platinum; SNEP: Gold	Mr. Morale & the Big Steppers
"Silent Hill" (with Kodak Black)	2022	7	5	4	21	14	80	—	— (Note: "Silent Hill" did not enter the Swedish Singellista Chart, but peaked at number two on the Swedish Heatseeker Chart.)	— (Note: "Silent Hill" did not enter the UK Singles Chart, but peaked at number 38 on the UK Streaming Chart.)	15	ARIA: Gold	Mr. Morale & the Big Steppers
"Die Hard" (with Blxst and Amanda Reifer)	2022	5	4	—	5	5	32	6	23	7	7	ARIA: Platinum; BPI: Silver; RMNZ: Platinum	Mr. Morale & the Big Steppers
"The Hillbillies" (with Baby Keem)	2023	93	34	23	—	80	—	— (Note: "The Hillbillies" did not enter the NZ Top 40 Singles Chart, but peaked at number 14 on the NZ Hot Singles Chart.)	—	—	—	RIAA: Gold	Non-album single
"Like That" (with Future and Metro Boomin)	2024	1	1	1	8	1	66	2	46	6	1	RIAA: 7× Platinum; ARIA: Platinum; BPI: Platinum; BRMA: Gold; MC: 3× Platinum; RMNZ: 2× Platinum; SNEP: Gold	We Don't Trust You
"Euphoria"	2024	3	3	2	8	5	76	5	26	11	4	ARIA: Platinum; BPI: Silver; RMNZ: Platinum	Non-album singles
"Meet the Grahams"	2024	12	6	5	42	16	—	22	92	28	17	ARIA: Gold	Non-album singles
"Not Like Us"	2024	1	1	1	1	1	43	1	3	1	1	ARIA: 6× Platinum; BPI: 2× Platinum; BRMA: Platinum; MC: Platinum; RMNZ: 5× Platinum; SNEP: Diamond	Non-album singles
"Squabble Up"	2024	1	1	1	9	3	53	4	26	4	3	ARIA: Platinum; BPI: Silver; RMNZ: Platinum	GNX
"TV Off" (featuring Lefty Gunplay)	2024	2	1	1	12	7	64	5	22	6	5	ARIA: Platinum; BPI: Gold; BRMA: Gold; RMNZ: 2× Platinum	GNX
"Luther" (with SZA)	2024	1	1	1	2	2	45	1	21	4	3	ARIA: 4× Platinum; BPI: Platinum; BRMA: Gold; RMNZ: 4× Platinum; SNEP: Gold	GNX
"30 for 30" (with SZA)	2025	10	4	—	39	31	—	22	96	33	27	RIAA: 2× Platinum; BPI: Silver; MC: Platinum; RMNZ: Platinum	Lana
"Peekaboo" (featuring AzChike)	2025	13	9	9	48	35	—	29	— (Note: "Peekaboo" did not enter the Swedish Singellista Chart, but peaked at number two on the Swedish Heatseeker Chart.)	—	20	RMNZ: Gold	GNX
"—" denotes a recording that did not chart or was not released in that territory.

== As featured artist ==
List of singles as featured artist, showing selected chart positions, certifications, and associated albums
Title	Year	Peak chart positions										Certifications	Album
Title	Year	US	US R&B /HH	US Rap	AUS	BEL (FL)	CAN	DEN	FRA	NZ	UK	Certifications	Album
"Compton's Finest" (H.O.P.E. Wright featuring Kendrick Lamar)	2010	—	—	—	—	—	—	—	—	—	—		Non-album singles
"College Girls" (8 Ounz featuring Kendrick Lamar)	2011	—	—	—	—	—	—	—	—	—	—		Non-album singles
"Hood Gone Love It" (Jay Rock featuring Kendrick Lamar)	2011	—	— (Note: "Hood Gone Love It" did not enter the Hot R&B/Hip-Hop Songs chart, but peaked at number 18 on the Bubbling Under R&B/Hip-Hop Singles chart, which acts as an extension to the Hot R&B/Hip-Hop Songs chart.)	—	—	—	—	—	—	—	—	RMNZ: Gold	Follow Me Home
"Star Life" (Lyn Charles featuring Kendrick Lamar)	2012	—	—	—	—	—	—	—	—	—	—		American Tragedy
"B-Boyz" (Birdman featuring Mack Maine, Kendrick Lamar, Ace Hood, and DJ Khaled)	2012	—	—	—	—	—	—	—	—	—	—		Non-album single
"Push Thru" (Talib Kweli featuring Kendrick Lamar and Currensy)	2012	—	—	—	—	—	—	—	—	—	—		Prisoner of Conscious
"Fuckin' Problems" (ASAP Rocky featuring Drake, 2 Chainz, and Kendrick Lamar)	2012	8	2	2	78	— (Note: "Fuckin' Problems" did not enter the Flanders Ultratop 50, but peaked at number 33 on the Ultratip chart.)	65	—	30	—	50	RIAA: 8× Platinum; ARIA: 3× Platinum; BPI: Platinum; IFPI DEN: Platinum; MC: Platinum; RMNZ: 4× Platinum	Long. Live. ASAP
"Let Us Move On" (Dido featuring Kendrick Lamar)	2012	—	—	—	—	—	—	—	—	—	—		Girl Who Got Away
"YOLO" (The Lonely Island featuring Adam Levine and Kendrick Lamar)	2013	60	—	—	31	— (Note: "YOLO" did not enter the Flanders Ultratop 50, but peaked at number 36 on the Ultratip chart.)	26	—	—	26	77		The Wack Album
"How Many Drinks?" (Miguel featuring Kendrick Lamar)	2013	69	24	—	—	—	—	—	—	—	—	RIAA: Platinum; RMNZ: 2× Platinum	Kaleidoscope Dream
"We Up" (50 Cent featuring Kendrick Lamar)	2013	—	50	—	—	—	85	—	—	—	—		Non-album singles
"Memories Back Then" (T.I. featuring B.o.B, Kendrick Lamar, and Kris Stephens)	2013	88	30	7	—	—	—	—	—	—	—		Non-album singles
"Looks Good with Trouble" (Solange featuring Kendrick Lamar)	2013	—	—	—	—	—	—	—	—	—	—		Non-album singles
"Street Dreamin'" (Bridget Kelly featuring Kendrick Lamar)	2013	—	89	—	—	—	—	—	—	—	—		All or Nothing
"Collard Greens" (Schoolboy Q featuring Kendrick Lamar)	2013	92	28	21	—	—	—	—	—	—	—	RIAA: 5× Platinum; BPI: Gold; IFPI DEN: Gold; RMNZ: 4× Platinum	Oxymoron
"Fragile" (Tech N9ne featuring Kendrick Lamar, ¡Mayday!, and Kendall Morgan)	2013	— (Note: "Fragile" did not enter the Billboard Hot 100, but peaked at number 16 on the Bubbling Under Hot 100 Singles chart.)	38	23	—	—	—	—	—	—	—	RIAA: Gold; RMNZ: Gold	Something Else
"Forbidden Fruit" (J. Cole featuring Kendrick Lamar)	2013	—	46	—	—	—	—	—	—	—	—	RMNZ: Gold	Born Sinner
"Give It 2 U" (Robin Thicke featuring Kendrick Lamar)	2013	25	7	—	41	— (Note: "Give It 2 U" did not enter the Flanders Ultratop 50, but peaked at number 10 on the Ultratip chart.)	27	—	53	29	15	ARIA: Gold	Blurred Lines
"Jealous" (Fredo Santana featuring Kendrick Lamar)	2013	—	—	—	—	—	—	—	—	—	—		Trappin' Ain't Dead
"Radioactive" (Imagine Dragons featuring Kendrick Lamar)	2014	—	—	—	—	—	—	—	—	—	32		Non-album single
"Nosetalgia" (Pusha T featuring Kendrick Lamar)	2014	—	—	—	—	—	—	—	—	—	—		My Name Is My Name
"It's On Again" (Alicia Keys featuring Kendrick Lamar)	2014	—	49	—	81	— (Note: "It's On Again" did not enter the Flanders Ultratop 50, but peaked at number 16 on the Ultratip chart.)	—	—	62	—	31		Music from and Inspired by The Amazing Spider-Man 2
"Buy the World" (Mike Will Made It featuring Future, Lil Wayne, and Kendrick Lamar)	2014	—	42	—	—	—	—	—	—	—	—	RIAA: Gold	Ransom
"That's Me Right There" (Jasmine V featuring Kendrick Lamar)	2014	— (Note: "That's Me Right There" did not enter the Billboard Hot 100, but peaked at number five on the Bubbling Under Hot 100 Singles chart.)	35	—	—	—	—	—	—	—	—		That's Me Right There
"Never Catch Me" (Flying Lotus featuring Kendrick Lamar)	2014	—	—	—	—	— (Note: "Never Catch Me" did not enter the Flanders Ultratop 50, but peaked at number 21 on the Ultratip chart.)	—	—	—	—	—		You're Dead!
"Pay for It" (Jay Rock featuring Kendrick Lamar)	2014	—	—	—	—	—	—	—	—	—	—		Non-album single
"Thuggin'" (Glasses Malone featuring Kendrick Lamar)	2015	—	—	—	—	—	—	—	—	—	—		GH2: Life Ain't Nuthin' But
"Bad Blood" (Taylor Swift featuring Kendrick Lamar)	2015	1	—	—	1	26	1	28	14	1	4	RIAA: 6× Platinum; ARIA: 9× Platinum; BPI: 2× Platinum; IFPI DEN: Gold; MC: 3× Platinum; RMNZ: 3× Platinum	Non-album singles
"Ain't That Funkin' Kinda Hard on You? (We Ain't Neva Gonna Stop Remix)" (Funkadelic featuring Kendrick Lamar and Ice Cube)	2016	—	—	—	—	—	—	—	—	—	—		Non-album singles
"Holy Key" (DJ Khaled featuring Big Sean, Betty Wright, and Kendrick Lamar)	2016	84	29	22	99	—	—	—	—	— (Note: "Holy Key" did not enter the NZ Top 40 Singles Chart, but peaked at number five on the NZ Heatseekers Singles Chart.)	—	RIAA: Gold	Major Key
"The Greatest" (Sia featuring Kendrick Lamar)	2016	18	—	—	2	7	6	5	3	5	5	RIAA: 4× Platinum; ARIA: 2× Platinum; BPI: 2× Platinum; BRMA: Platinum; IFPI DEN: 2× Platinum; MC: 4× Platinum; RMNZ: 3× Platinum; SNEP: Diamond	This Is Acting (Deluxe Version)
"Freedom" (Beyoncé featuring Kendrick Lamar)	2016	35	21	—	62	—	60	—	—	—	40	RIAA: Platinum; ARIA: Gold; BPI: Silver	Lemonade
"Really Doe" (Danny Brown featuring Kendrick Lamar, Ab-Soul, and Earl Sweatshirt)	2016	—	—	—	—	— (Note: "Really Doe" did not enter the Flanders Ultratop 50, but charted as an "extra tip" on the Ultratip chart.)	—	—	—	—	—		Atrocity Exhibition
"Don't Wanna Know" (Maroon 5 featuring Kendrick Lamar)	2016	6	—	—	6	33	6	5	20	4	5	RIAA: 2× Platinum; ARIA: 5× Platinum; BPI: Platinum; BRMA: Gold; IFPI DEN: Platinum; MC: 5× Platinum; RMNZ: 3× Platinum; SNEP: Gold	Red Pill Blues
"Goosebumps" (Travis Scott featuring Kendrick Lamar)	2016	32	21	13	45	— (Note: "Goosebumps" did not enter the Flanders Ultratop 50, but charted as an "extra tip" on the Ultratip chart.)	56	—	23	—	65	RIAA: 17× Platinum; ARIA: 5× Platinum; BPI: 3× Platinum; BRMA: Platinum; IFPI DEN: 3× Platinum; MC: 6× Platinum; RMNZ: 8× Platinum; SNEP: Diamond	Birds in the Trap Sing McKnight
"Perfect Pint" (Mike Will Made It featuring Kendrick Lamar, Rae Sremmurd, and Gucci Mane)	2017	—	— (Note: "Perfect Pint" did not enter the Hot R&B/Hip-Hop Songs chart, but peaked at number six on the Bubbling Under R&B/Hip-Hop Singles chart.)	—	—	—	—	—	—	—	—		Ransom 2
"New Freezer" (Rich the Kid featuring Kendrick Lamar)	2017	41	22	18	—	— (Note: "New Freezer" did not enter the Flanders Ultratop 50, but charted as an "extra tip" on the Ultratip chart.)	66	—	—	—	—	RIAA: 3× Platinum; BPI: Silver; MC: Platinum; RMNZ: Gold	The World Is Yours
"Get Out of Your Own Way" (U2 featuring Kendrick Lamar)	2017	—	—	—	—	—	—	—	89	—	—		Songs of Experience
"Don't Don't Do It" (N.E.R.D featuring Kendrick Lamar)	2017	—	—	—	—	—	—	—	—	—	—		No One Ever Really Dies
"Dedication" (Nipsey Hussle featuring Kendrick Lamar)	2018	93	33	—	—	—	—	—	—	—	—	RIAA: Platinum	Victory Lap
"Tints" (Anderson .Paak featuring Kendrick Lamar)	2018	— (Note: "Tints" did not enter the Billboard Hot 100, but peaked at number 22 on the Bubbling Under Hot 100 Singles chart.)	—	—	81	50	—	—	—	— (Note: "Tints" did not enter the NZ Top 40 Singles Chart, but peaked at number seven on the NZ Hot Singles Chart.)	81	RIAA: Gold; RMNZ: Gold	Oxnard
"Hair Down" (Sir featuring Kendrick Lamar)	2019	—	—	—	—	— (Note: "Hair Down" did not enter the Flanders Ultratop 50, but charted as an "extra tip" on the Ultratip chart.)	—	—	—	—	—	RIAA: Gold; RMNZ: Gold	Chasing Summer
"America Has a Problem" (Beyoncé featuring Kendrick Lamar)	2023	38	11	—	32	—	41	—	—	25	—	RIAA: Platinum; ARIA: Gold; BPI: Silver; MC: Platinum; RMNZ: Gold	Non-album single
"—" denotes a recording that did not chart or was not released in that territory.

== Promotional singles ==
List of singles as featured artist, showing selected chart positions, certifications, and associated albums
Title	Year	Peak chart positions										Certifications	Album
Title	Year	US	US R&B /HH	US Rap	AUS	CAN	FRA	NZ	UK	UK R&B	WW	Certifications	Album
"Compton" (featuring Dr. Dre)	2012	—	— (Note: "Compton" did not enter the Hot R&B/Hip-Hop Songs chart, but peaked at number two on the Bubbling Under R&B/Hip-Hop Singles chart.)	—	—	—	—	—	—	—	—		Good Kid, M.A.A.D City
"Control" (Big Sean featuring Kendrick Lamar and Jay Electronica)	2013	— (Note: "Control" did not enter the Billboard Hot 100, but peaked at number 11 on the Bubbling Under Hot 100 Singles chart.)	43	—	—	—	—	—	—	—	—		Non-album single
"No More Parties in LA" (Kanye West featuring Kendrick Lamar)	2016	—	— (Note: "No More Parties in LA" did not enter the Hot R&B/Hip-Hop Songs chart, but peaked at number two on the Bubbling Under R&B/Hip-Hop Singles chart.)	—	—	—	—	—	133	39	—	RIAA: Platinum; BPI: Silver; RMNZ: Gold	The Life of Pablo
"The Heart Part 4"	2017	22	11	7	35	25	47	— (Note: "The Heart Part 4" did not enter the NZ Top 40 Singles Chart, but peaked at number two on the NZ Heatseeker Singles Chart.)	61	21	—		Non-album single
"The Heart Part 5"	2022	15	5	4	31	18	151	15	24	10	25		Mr. Morale & the Big Steppers
"Super Bowl LIX Halftime Show" (live)	2025	—	—	—	—	—	—	—	—	—	—		Super Bowl LIX Live from New Orleans, LA
"Chains & Whips" (with Clipse)	2025	42	9	—	—	79	—	13	82	21	93		Let God Sort Em Out
"—" denotes a recording that did not chart or was not released in that territory.

== Other charted and certified songs ==
=== 2010s ===
List of songs released in the 2010s decade, showing selected chart positions, certifications, and associated albums
Title	Year	Peak chart positions										Certifications	Album
Title	Year	US	US R&B /HH	US Rap	AUS	CAN	IRE	NZ	SWE	UK	WW	Certifications	Album
"A.D.H.D."	2011	—	— (Note: "A.D.H.D." did not enter the Hot R&B/Hip-Hop Songs chart, but peaked at number 8 on the Bubbling Under R&B/Hip-Hop Singles chart.)	—	—	—	—	—	—	—	—	RIAA: Gold; BPI: Gold; RMNZ: Platinum	Section.80
"Sherane a.k.a Master Splinter's Daughter"	2012	—	42	—	—	—	—	—	—	—	—		Good Kid, M.A.A.D City
"The Art of Peer Pressure"	2012	—	39	—	—	—	—	—	—	—	—	ARIA: Gold	Good Kid, M.A.A.D City
"Money Trees" (featuring Jay Rock)	2012	— (Note: "Money Trees" did not enter the Billboard Hot 100, but peaked at number 19 on the Bubbling Under Hot 100 Singles chart.)	17	—	43	—	—	24	— (Note: "Money Trees" did not enter the Swedish Singellista Chart, but peaked at number 10 on the Swedish Heatseeker Chart.)	—	42	RIAA: Platinum; ARIA: 8× Platinum; BPI: 2× Platinum; RMNZ: 8× Platinum	Good Kid, M.A.A.D City
"Good Kid"	2012	—	44	—	—	—	—	—	—	—	—		Good Kid, M.A.A.D City
"M.A.A.d City" (featuring MC Eiht)	2012	75	24	10	—	92	—	—	—	—	—	RIAA: 2× Platinum; ARIA: 4× Platinum; BPI: Platinum; RMNZ: 3× Platinum	Good Kid, M.A.A.D City
"Sing About Me, I'm Dying of Thirst"	2012	—	—	—	—	—	—	—	—	—	—	BPI: Silver; RMNZ: Gold	Good Kid, M.A.A.D City
"1 Train" (ASAP Rocky featuring Kendrick Lamar, Joey Badass, Yelawolf, Danny Brown, Action Bronson, and Big K.R.I.T.)	2013	— (Note: "1 Train" did not enter the Billboard Hot 100, but peaked at number three on the Bubbling Under Hot 100 Singles chart.)	31	25	—	—	—	—	—	—	—	RIAA: Gold; RMNZ: Gold	Long. Live. ASAP
"Solo Dolo, Pt. II" (Kid Cudi featuring Kendrick Lamar)	2013	—	— (Note: "Solo Dolo, Part II" did not enter the Hot R&B/Hip-Hop Songs chart, but peaked at number one on the Bubbling Under R&B/Hip-Hop Singles chart.)	—	—	—	—	—	—	—	—		Indicud
"Love Game" (Eminem featuring Kendrick Lamar)	2013	—	31	23	—	91	—	—	—	94	—	RMNZ: Gold	The Marshall Mathers LP 2
"Stay Ready (What a Life)" (Jhené Aiko featuring Kendrick Lamar)	2013	—	—	—	—	—	—	—	—	—	—	RIAA: Platinum; BPI: Gold; RMNZ: Platinum	Sail Out
"Autumn Leaves" (Chris Brown featuring Kendrick Lamar)	2014	— (Note: "Autumn Leaves" did not enter the Billboard Hot 100, but peaked at number ten on the Bubbling Under Hot 100 Singles chart.)	36	—	—	—	—	—	—	—	—	RIAA: Gold; RMNZ: Gold	X
"Wesley's Theory" (featuring George Clinton and Thundercat)	2015	91	33	23	—	—	—	—	— (Note: "Wesley's Theory" did not enter the Swedish Singles Chart, but peaked at number 16 on the Swedish Heatseeker chart.)	76	—	BPI: Silver; RMNZ: Gold	To Pimp a Butterfly
"For Free? (Interlude)"	2015	— (Note: "For Free? (Interlude)" did not enter the Billboard Hot 100, but peaked at number 24 on the Bubbling Under Hot 100 Singles chart.)	44	—	—	—	—	—	—	—	—		To Pimp a Butterfly
"Institutionalized" (featuring Bilal, Anna Wise, and Snoop Dogg)	2015	99	35	—	—	—	—	—	—	92	—		To Pimp a Butterfly
"U"	2015	— (Note: "u" did not enter the Billboard Hot 100, but peaked at number one on the Bubbling Under Hot 100 Singles chart.)	37	—	—	—	—	—	—	—	—		To Pimp a Butterfly
"For Sale? (Interlude)"	2015	— (Note: "For Sale? (Interlude)" did not enter the Billboard Hot 100, but peaked at number 23 on the Bubbling Under Hot 100 Singles chart.)	50	—	—	—	—	—	—	—	—		To Pimp a Butterfly
"Momma"	2015	— (Note: "Momma" did not enter the Billboard Hot 100, but peaked at number 18 on the Bubbling Under Hot 100 Singles chart.)	45	—	—	—	—	—	—	—	—		To Pimp a Butterfly
"Hood Politics"	2015	— (Note: "Hood Politics" did not enter the Billboard Hot 100, but peaked at number two on the Bubbling Under Hot 100 Singles chart.)	38	—	—	—	—	—	—	—	—		To Pimp a Butterfly
"How Much a Dollar Cost" (featuring James Fauntleroy and Ronald Isley)	2015	— (Note: "How Much A Dollar Cost" did not enter the Billboard Hot 100, but peaked at number nine on the Bubbling Under Hot 100 Singles chart.)	40	—	—	—	—	—	—	—	—		To Pimp a Butterfly
"Complexion (A Zulu Love)" (featuring Rapsody)	2015	— (Note: "Complexion (A Zulu Love)" did not enter the Billboard Hot 100, but peaked at number 25 on the Bubbling Under Hot 100 Singles chart.)	— (Note: "Complexion (A Zulu Love)" did not enter the Hot R&B/Hip-Hop Songs chart, but peaked at number one on the Bubbling Under R&B/Hip-Hop Singles chart.)	—	—	—	—	—	—	—	—		To Pimp a Butterfly
"You Ain't Gotta Lie (Momma Said)"	2015	—	— (Note: "You Ain't Gotta Lie (Momma Said)" did not enter the Hot R&B/Hip-Hop Songs chart, but peaked at number two on the Bubbling Under R&B/Hip-Hop Singles chart.)	—	—	—	—	—	—	—	—		To Pimp a Butterfly
"Mortal Man"	2015	—	— (Note: "Mortal Man" did not enter the Hot R&B/Hip-Hop Songs chart, but peaked at number seven on the Bubbling Under R&B/Hip-Hop Singles chart.)	—	—	—	—	—	—	—	—		To Pimp a Butterfly
"On Me" (The Game featuring Kendrick Lamar)	2015	—	— (Note: "On Me" did not enter the Hot R&B/Hip-Hop Songs chart, but peaked at number six on the Bubbling Under R&B/Hip-Hop Singles chart.)	—	—	—	—	—	—	—	—		The Documentary 2
"Deep Water" (Dr. Dre featuring Kendrick Lamar, Justus, and Anderson .Paak)	2015	—	— (Note: "Deep Water" did not enter the Hot R&B/Hip-Hop Songs chart, but peaked at number six on the Bubbling Under R&B/Hip-Hop Singles chart.)	—	—	—	—	—	—	—	—		Compton
"Genocide" (Dr. Dre featuring Kendrick Lamar, Marsha Ambrosius, and Candice Pillay)	2015	—	— (Note: "Genocide" did not enter the Hot R&B/Hip-Hop Songs chart, but peaked at number two on the Bubbling Under R&B/Hip-Hop Singles chart.)	—	—	—	—	—	—	—	—		Compton
"Untitled 01 | 08.19.2014."	2016	—	— (Note: "Untitled 01 | 08.19.2014." did not enter the Hot R&B/Hip-Hop Songs chart, but peaked at number five on the Bubbling Under R&B/Hip-Hop Singles chart.)	—	—	—	—	—	—	87	—		Untitled Unmastered
"Untitled 02 | 06.23.2014"	2016	79	23	12	71	—	—	—	—	57	—	RIAA: Gold; RMNZ: Gold	Untitled Unmastered
"Untitled 03 | 05.28.2013"	2016	—	49	—	—	—	—	—	—	67	—		Untitled Unmastered
"Untitled 05 | 09.21.2014."	2016	—	— (Note: "Untitled 05 | 09.21.2014." did not enter the Hot R&B/Hip-Hop Songs chart, but peaked at number seven on the Bubbling Under R&B/Hip-Hop Singles chart.)	—	—	—	—	—	—	—	—		Untitled Unmastered
"Untitled 06 | 06.30.2014."	2016	—	— (Note: "Untitled 06 | 06.30.2014." did not enter the Hot R&B/Hip-Hop Songs chart, but peaked at number eight on the Bubbling Under R&B/Hip-Hop Singles chart.)	—	—	—	—	—	—	—	—		Untitled Unmastered
"Untitled 08 | 09.06.2014."	2016	—	— (Note: "Untitled 08 | 09.06.2014." did not enter the Hot R&B/Hip-Hop Songs chart, but peaked at number three on the Bubbling Under R&B/Hip-Hop Singles chart.)	—	—	—	—	—	—	—	—		Untitled Unmastered
"Wat's Wrong" (Isaiah Rashad featuring Kendrick Lamar and Zacari)	2016	—	—	—	—	—	—	—	—	—	—	RIAA: Platinum; RMNZ: Gold	The Sun's Tirade
"God is Fair, Sexy Nasty" (Mac Miller featuring Kendrick Lamar)	2016	—	—	—	—	—	—	—	—	—	—	RIAA: Gold	The Divine Feminine
"Sidewalks" (The Weeknd featuring Kendrick Lamar)	2016	27	12	—	—	14	—	—	—	30	—	BPI: Silver; MC: Platinum; RMNZ: Platinum	Starboy
"Blood"	2017	54	31	25	—	41	41	— (Note: "Blood" did not enter the NZ Top 40 Singles Chart, but peaked at number one on the NZ Heatseekers Singles Chart.)	95	56	—	RIAA: Gold; ARIA: Gold; MC: Gold	Damn
"DNA"	2017	4	3	2	16	3	12	5	37	18	—	RIAA: 3× Platinum; ARIA: 5× Platinum; BPI: Platinum; MC: 5× Platinum; RMNZ: 4× Platinum; SNEP: Platinum	Damn
"Yah"	2017	32	18	14	—	27	29	30	69	45	—	RIAA: Gold; ARIA: Gold; MC: Platinum; RMNZ: Gold	Damn
"Element"	2017	16	9	8	—	16	17	23	50	33	—	RIAA: Platinum; ARIA: 2× Platinum; BPI: Gold; MC: 2× Platinum; RMNZ: Platinum	Damn
"Feel"	2017	35	21	17	—	30	34	32	51	46	—	RIAA: Gold; ARIA: Gold; BPI: Silver; MC: Platinum; RMNZ: Gold	Damn
"Pride"	2017	37	22	18	—	32	35	34	72	49	—	RIAA: Gold; ARIA: 3× Platinum; BPI: Platinum; MC: Platinum; RMNZ: 2× Platinum; SNEP: Platinum	Damn
"Lust"	2017	42	25	20	—	35	36	36	94	52	—	RIAA: Gold; ARIA: Gold; MC: Platinum; RMNZ: Gold	Damn
"XXX" (featuring U2)	2017	33	19	15	—	36	22	31	82	50	—	RIAA: Gold; ARIA: Platinum; BPI: Silver; MC: Platinum; RMNZ: Gold	Damn
"Fear"	2017	50	29	23	—	43	43	— (Note: "Fear" did not enter the NZ Top 40 Singles Chart, but peaked at number two on the NZ Heatseekers Singles Chart.)	—	68	—	RIAA: Gold; ARIA: Gold; MC: Gold; RMNZ: Gold	Damn
"God"	2017	58	33	—	—	50	57	—	—	81	—	RIAA: Gold; ARIA: Gold; MC: Gold; RMNZ: Gold	Damn
"Duckworth"	2017	63	36	—	—	52	52	—	—	80	—	RIAA: Gold; ARIA: Platinum; BPI: Silver; MC: Gold; RMNZ: Platinum	Damn
"Doves in the Wind" (SZA featuring Kendrick Lamar)	2017	— (Note: "Doves in the Wind" did not enter the Billboard Hot 100, but peaked at number 12 on the Bubbling Under Hot 100 Singles chart.)	— (Note: "Doves in the Wind" did not enter the Hot R&B/Hip-Hop Songs chart, but peaked at number two on the Bubbling Under R&B/Hip-Hop Singles chart.)	—	—	—	—	—	—	—	—	RIAA: 2× Platinum; BPI: Silver; MC: Platinum; RMNZ: Platinum	Ctrl
"Black Panther"	2018	91	42	—	—	62	—	—	95	42	—	MC: Gold	Black Panther: The Album
"Big Shot" (with Travis Scott)	2018	71	35	—	—	54	—	—	58	55	—	ARIA: Gold; MC: Platinum; RMNZ: Gold	Black Panther: The Album
"Wow Freestyle" (Jay Rock featuring Kendrick Lamar)	2018	—	—	—	—	—	—	—	—	—	—	RIAA: Platinum; RMNZ: Gold	Redemption
"Mona Lisa" (Lil Wayne featuring Kendrick Lamar)	2018	2	1	1	42	7	19	39	36	21	—	RIAA: 2× Platinum; RMNZ: Gold	Tha Carter V
"Momma I Hit a Lick" (2 Chainz featuring Kendrick Lamar)	2019	100	40	—	—	—	—	—	—	—	—		Rap or Go to the League
"—" denotes a recording that did not chart or was not released in that territory.

=== 2020s ===
List of songs released in the 2020s decade, showing selected chart positions, certifications, and associated albums
Title	Year	Peak chart positions										Certifications	Album
Title	Year	US	US R&B /HH	US Rap	AUS	CAN	IRE	NZ	SWE	UK	WW	Certifications	Album
"Range Brothers" (with Baby Keem)	2021	53	23	20	—	61	—	—	—	—	73	RIAA: Gold	The Melodic Blue
"United in Grief"	2022	8	6	5	7	8	—	7	53	14	9	ARIA: Platinum; BPI: Silver; RMNZ: Gold	Mr. Morale & the Big Steppers
"Worldwide Steppers"	2022	19	12	10	17	19	—	—	83	— (Note: "Worldwide Steppers" did not enter the UK Singles Chart, but peaked at number 29 on the UK Streaming Chart.)	18		Mr. Morale & the Big Steppers
"Father Time" (featuring Sampha)	2022	11	9	7	11	10	—	8	57	47	13	ARIA: Gold; BPI: Silver; RMNZ: Gold	Mr. Morale & the Big Steppers
"Rich (Interlude)"	2022	33	18	16	—	33	—	—	37	— (Note: "Crown" did not enter the UK Singles Chart, but peaked at number 50 on the UK Streaming Chart.)	34		Mr. Morale & the Big Steppers
"Rich Spirit"	2022	13	10	8	16	12	—	—	—	85	16	ARIA: Platinum; BPI: Silver; RMNZ: Gold	Mr. Morale & the Big Steppers
"We Cry Together" (with Taylour Paige)	2022	16	11	9	19	22	—	—	96	— (Note: "Rich Spirit" did not enter the UK Singles Chart, but peaked at number 33 on the UK Streaming Chart.)	20		Mr. Morale & the Big Steppers
"Purple Hearts" (with Summer Walker and Ghostface Killah)	2022	22	14	12	22	27	—	—	— (Note: "Purple Hearts" did not enter the Swedish Singellista Chart, but peaked at number three on the Swedish Heatseeker Chart.)	— (Note: "Purple Hearts" did not enter the UK Singles Chart, but peaked at number 36 on the UK Streaming Chart.)	24		Mr. Morale & the Big Steppers
"Count Me Out"	2022	20	13	11	20	21	—	— (Note: "Count Me Out" did not enter the NZ Top 40 Singles Chart, but peaked at number 39 on the NZ Hot Singles Chart.)	— (Note: "Count Me Out" did not enter the Swedish Singellista Chart, but peaked at number one on the Swedish Heatseeker Chart.)	— (Note: "Purple Hearts" did not enter the UK Singles Chart, but peaked at number 35 on the UK Streaming Chart.)	21	ARIA: Platinum; BPI: Silver; RMNZ: Gold	Mr. Morale & the Big Steppers
"Crown"	2022	41	20	18	44	38	—	—	—	— (Note: "Crown" did not enter the UK Singles Chart, but peaked at number 59 on the UK Streaming Chart.)	42		Mr. Morale & the Big Steppers
"Savior (Interlude)"	2022	51	22	21	—	42	—	—	58	— (Note: "Savior" did not enter the UK Singles Chart, but peaked at number 89 on the UK Streaming Chart.)	53		Mr. Morale & the Big Steppers
"Savior" (with Baby Keem and Sam Dew)	2022	23	15	13	30	26	—	—	—	— (Note: "Savior" did not enter the UK Singles Chart, but peaked at number 47 on the UK Streaming Chart.)	26	ARIA: Gold	Mr. Morale & the Big Steppers
"Auntie Diaries"	2022	47	21	20	48	39	—	—	—	— (Note: "Auntie Diaries" did not enter the UK Singles Chart, but peaked at number 64 on the UK Streaming Chart.)	50		Mr. Morale & the Big Steppers
"Mr. Morale" (with Tanna Leone)	2022	40	19	17	43	34	—	—	—	— (Note: "Mr. Morale" did not enter the UK Singles Chart, but peaked at number 65 on the UK Streaming Chart.)	41		Mr. Morale & the Big Steppers
"Mother I Sober" (with Beth Gibbons)	2022	59	25	24	—	47	—	—	—	— (Note: "Mother I Sober" did not enter the UK Singles Chart, but peaked at number 92 on the UK Streaming Chart.)	65		Mr. Morale & the Big Steppers
"Mirror"	2022	55	23	22	—	43	—	—	—	— (Note: "Mirror" did not enter the UK Singles Chart, but peaked at number 98 on the UK Streaming Chart.)	63		Mr. Morale & the Big Steppers
"Bad Blood (Taylor's Version)" (Taylor Swift featuring Kendrick Lamar)	2023	—	—	—	—	—	—	10	—	—	—	ARIA: Platinum; RMNZ: Gold	1989 (Taylor's Version) [Deluxe]
"Wacced Out Murals"	2024	4	4	4	18	10	—	9	44	—	6		GNX
"Man at the Garden"	2024	9	7	7	29	25	—	21	77	—	13		GNX
"Hey Now" (featuring Dody6)	2024	5	5	5	26	18	—	15	78	—	10		GNX
"Reincarnated"	2024	8	6	6	25	21	—	17	65	—	12		GNX
"Dodger Blue" (featuring Wallie the Sensei, Siete7x and Roddy Ricch)	2024	11	8	8	37	29	—	18	— (Note: "Dodger Blue" did not enter the Swedish Singellista Chart, but peaked at number one on the Swedish Heatseeker Chart.)	—	15		GNX
"Heart Pt. 6"	2024	14	10	10	35	30	—	22	87	—	16		GNX
"GNX" (featuring Hitta J3, YoungThreat, and Peysoh)	2024	24	11	11	72	49	—	36	— (Note: "GNX" did not enter the Swedish Singellista Chart, but peaked at number 14 on the Swedish Heatseeker Chart.)	—	35		GNX
"Gloria" (with SZA)	2024	27	13	13	51	40	—	23	— (Note: "Gloria" did not enter the Swedish Singellista Chart, but peaked at number five on the Swedish Heatseeker Chart.)	—	32		GNX
"Backd00r" (Playboi Carti featuring Kendrick Lamar and Jhené Aiko)	2025	25	11	10	61	36	—	36	— (Note: "Backd00r" did not enter the Swedish Singellista Chart, but peaked at number 17 on the Sweden Heatseeker Chart.)	— (Note: "Backd00r" did not enter the UK Singles Chart, as chart rules only allow three songs per artist to chart within the top one hundred at a time, but peaked at number 57 on the Official UK Streaming chart.)	25		Music
"Good Credit" (with Playboi Carti)	2025	17	7	7	50	31	—	31	— (Note: "Good Credit" did not enter the Swedish Singellista Chart, but peaked at number four on the Sweden Heatseeker Chart.)	— (Note: "Good Credit" did not enter the UK Singles Chart, as chart rules only allow three songs per artist to chart within the top one hundred at a time, but peaked at number 56 on the Official UK Streaming chart.)	20	RIAA: Gold	Music
"How to Pray" (with Dahi and Amber Mark)	2026	—	—	—	—	—	—	— (Note: "How to Pray" did not enter the NZ Top 40 Singles Chart, but peaked at number 30 on the NZ Hot 40 Singles Chart.)	—	—	—		Black Boy (Alternative)
"—" denotes a recording that did not chart or was not released in that territory.

== Other guest appearances ==
List of non-single guest appearances, with other performing artists, showing year released and album name
Title	Year	Other artist(s)	Album
"The Cypha"	2006	The Game, Ya Boy, Jay Rock, Juice, Dubb	The Black Wall Street Journal Vol. 1
"Goin' Down"	2006	Jay Rock	Watts Finest Vol. I
"Act Tuff"	2006	Jay Rock	Watts Finest Vol. I
"Celebrity Scenarios"	2006	Jay Rock	Watts Finest Vol. I
"Tell Yo Momma"	2006	Jay Rock	Watts Finest Vol. I
"Watts Boyz"	2006	Jay Rock, Emjae	Watts Finest Vol. I
"Grillz"	2006	Jay Rock, Lea, Bash, Punch	Watts Finest Vol. I
"U Already Know"	2006	Jay Rock, Emjae	Watts Finest Vol. I
"Go K.Dot Freestyle"	2006	—N/a	Watts Finest Vol. I
"Gotta Have Heart"	2006	Jay Rock, Big Wy	Watts Finest Vol. II: The Nickerson Files
"U Ain't Sayin' Nothin' "	2006	Jay Rock, AJ, Lil Louie	Watts Finest Vol. II: The Nickerson Files
"Put That Gun Up"	2006	Jay Rock, Carl Ray	Watts Finest Vol. II: The Nickerson Files
"LA Shit"	2006	Jay Rock	Watts Finest Vol. II: The Nickerson Files
"Tell Yo Momma (Remix)"	2006	Jay Rock, Snoop Dogg	Watts Finest Vol. II: The Nickerson Files
"Cali Niggaz"	2007	The Game, Ya Boy, Jay Rock, Dubb, Topic, Eastwood	You Know What It Is Vol. 4: Murda Game Chronicles
"On Me"	2007	Tyga, Jay Rock	Young on Probation
"West Coast Niggaz"	2007	Jay Rock, The Game	Watts Finest Vol. III: The Watts Riots
"Big Guns"	2007	Jay Rock	Watts Finest Vol. III: The Watts Riots
"Killa Cali"	2007	Jay Rock	Watts Finest Vol. III: The Watts Riots
"J. Dilla Freestyle"	2007	Jay Rock, Punch	Watts Finest Vol. III: The Watts Riots
"Imagine"	2007	Jay Rock, Punch	Watts Finest Vol. III: The Watts Riots
"Ride Out"	2007	Jay Rock, Yung Dubb	Watts Finest Vol. III: The Watts Riots
"What Happen"	2007	Jay Rock, Ab-Soul	Watts Finest Vol. III: The Watts Riots
"WCCP"	2008	BO, Punch	The Rebirth of BO
"Top Dawg Ent."	2008	BO, Jay Rock, Ab-Soul	The Rebirth of BO
"Catch a Body"	2008	BO, Jay Rock	The Rebirth of BO
"Dead Rappers"	2008	Schoolboy Q	Schoolboy Turned Hustla
"That Nigga"	2009	Juice, Jay Rock	Position of Power
"High Oktane"	2009	Showkase	—N/a
"Nothing Less"	2009	Rapper Big Pooh, Ab-Soul, Jay Rock	The Delightful Bars
"Evil"	2009	Schoolboy Q	Gangsta & Soul
"Watch Yo Lady"	2009	Ab-Soul	Longterm
"Mandatory"	2009	Jay Rock, Ab-Soul	30 Day Takeover
"Full Time Gangsta"	2009	Jay Rock	30 Day Takeover
"Niggas Mad Cause I Can Rap"	2009	Jay Rock	30 Day Takeover
"I Know"	2009	Jay Rock, Ab-Soul	30 Day Takeover
"Colors"	2009	Jay Rock, Lil Wayne	30 Day Takeover
"Give Me Some of You"	2010	Terrace Martin	Here, My Dear
"Rappity Rap Remix"	2010	Terrace Martin	Here, My Dear
"I Had No Idea"	2010	Terrace Martin	Here, My Dear
"Maniac"	2010	CurT@!N$, Chace Infinite	Killer Tape
"Set Precedent"	2010	Mykestro	The Barmittzpha
"Boom Box"	2010	Bigg Steele, Chino XL	—N/a
"Purp & Yellow"	2010	Wiz Khalifa, The Game, Thurzday, Snoop Dogg, YG, Joe Moses	—N/a
"Roll On"	2010	Jay Rock, Major James	From Hood Tales to the Cover of XXL
"LA State of Mind"	2010	Jay Rock	—N/a
"Without You"	2010	One-2, Brian Rivers	—N/a
"West Coast State of Mind"	2010	Prince Charlez	—N/a
"One Run"	2010	Skeme	—N/a
"Till I'm Gone"	2010	Skeme	—N/a
"Everywhere That We Go"	2010	Sore Losers	Free Loaders: The Soundtrack
"Cooler Than Coach K Remix"	2010	Sore Losers, Jay Rock	Free Loaders: The Soundtrack
"Get Bizy"	2010	Terrace Martin, Kurupt, Bad Lucc	—N/a
"Hands Up"	2010	Conflict, Mykestro	Back to the Basics
"So Slow"	2010	YG Hootie	Red Zepplin
"Turn Me Up"	2010	Ab-Soul	Longterm 2: Lifestyles of the Broke and Almost Famous
"Fasho"	2010	Balance, Freeway, Jay Rock	We All In
"El Camp 2"	2010	Tae Beast, Ab-Soul, Schoolboy Q	TheTaeBeastTape
"American Me"	2010	Juice	American Me
"Diary of a Broke Nigga"	2010	Jay Rock, Giddy	Black Friday
"They Say"	2010	Jay Rock	Black Friday
"2U4U"	2011	Willie B	I'm Not a Producer
"Get Rich Quick Scheme"	2011	JaVonté	All in a Day's Work
"Legendary"	2011	Edgar Sosa, Celphi	Epidemic
"Double XL"	2011	J-Lie, Curren$y, Mickey Factz	Ears First, Hearts Next
"Rapper Shit" {unreleased}	2011	Ab-Soul	—N/a
"Super Genius"	2011	Cutlass Reid, Skewby, Naledge, Add2TheMC, Brittany Street, The Kid Daytona, Laws	
"How Far We Go (Uptown 81)"	2011	Smoke DZA	The Hustler's Catalog
"RapperPooh-A-Lude"	2011	Rapper Big Pooh	FatBoyFresh Vol. 1: For Members Only
"Code Red"	2011	Jay Rock	Follow Me Home
"Light Years Ahead / Live Again"	2011	Schoolboy Q	Setbacks
"Birdz & the Beez"	2011	Schoolboy Q	Setbacks
"Growing Apart Too"	2011	Jhené Aiko, H.O.P.E. Wright	Sailing Soul(s)
"Moscato"	2011	Ab-Soul	Longterm Mentality
"Up Against the Wall"	2011	Consequence, Roc Marciano	Movies on Demand II
"Textbook Stuff"	2011	XV	Zero Heroes
"Put That Mic Down"	2011	DJ Kay Slay, Fred the Godson, Jon Connor, Jay Rock	The Soul Controller
"I Love Music"	2011	Tech N9ne, Oobergeek	All 6's and 7's
"The City"	2011	Game	The R.E.D. Album
"Shitted on 'Em"	2011	Privilege	The Playbook
"Taking Me Down"	2011	Overdoz	Live For, Die For
"Rossi Wine"	2011	Droop-E	Rossi Fossi
"Ball Game"	2011	Smoke DZA	Rolling Stoned
"Malcolm X"	2011	K-Boy	Division Is the Gang
"Project Window"	2011	Punch	—N/a
"Thirsty"	2011	Terrace Martin, CyHi the Prynce	—N/a
"Pumped Up Kicks (Remix)"	2011	Foster the People, DJ Reflex	—N/a
"Over and Over"	2011	Shwayze, Cisco, Sophie Stern	Island in the Sun
"Ridin' Roun Town (Remix)"	2011	Casey Veggies, C-San, Dom Kennedy	Sleeping in Class: Deluxe Edition
"Enjoy"	2011	9th Wonder, Warren G, Murs	The Wonder Years
"Do It Again"	2011	Terrace Martin, Wiz Khalifa	Locke High 2
"Reasons for Seasons"	2011	Terrace Martin, Neka Brown	Locke High 2
"Whose House?"	2011	Slim the Mobster	War Music
"Buried Alive (Interlude)"	2011	Drake	Take Care
"The Look of Lust"	2011	Omen, Shalonda	Afraid of Heights
"Rock the Bells"	2011	Rapsody	For Everything
"Blessed"	2012	Schoolboy Q	Habits & Contradictions
"Heart of a Hustler"	2012	Cisco Adler, Jag	—N/a
"Girls in America"	2012	Micahfonecheck	—N/a
"You Don’t Like"	2012	Melo Kan	Mama's Only Sun
"Fight the Feeling"	2012	Mac Miller, Iman Omari	Macadelic
"Catch a Fade"	2012	E-40, Droop-E	The Block Brochure: Welcome to the Soil 3
"I'm Ghost"	2012	Infamous Haze, Nu Jerzey Devil, Tools	The Color Purple
"The World Is a Ghetto"	2012	BJ the Chicago Kid	Pineapple Now-Laters
"His Pain II"	2012	BJ the Chicago Kid	Pineapple Now-Laters
"Mona Lisa"	2012	J'Lynn	Lynn&Learn
"Pray for Me"	2012	Ransom	—N/a
"Staircases"	2012	Buddy	Idle Time
"Cruel"	2012	Microphone Tone, Jay Rock	Nachural Disaster
"A1 Everything"	2012	Meek Mill	Dreamchasers 2
"ILLuminate"	2012	Ab-Soul	Control System
"Thanksgiving (Remix)"	2012	DJ EFN, ¡Mayday!, Blood Type	—N/a
"Power Circle"	2012	Gunplay, Stalley, Wale, Rick Ross, Meek Mill	Self Made Vol. 2
"S.S.L (Solid Sound Logic)"	2012	Terrace Martin, Problem, A Da Business	—N/a
"We Ball"	2012	Dom Kennedy	Yellow Album
"Energetik"	2012	Big Scoob, E-40	Dope Talk Vol. 2
"Flower Child"	2012	Nitty Scott, MC	The BoomBox Diaries Vol. 1
"They Ready"	2012	DJ Khaled, Big K.R.I.T., J. Cole	Kiss the Ring
"I'm On 2.0"	2012	Trae tha Truth, Mark Morrison, Big K.R.I.T., Jadakiss, J. Cole, B.o.B, Tyga, Gudda Gudda, Bun B	Tha Blackprint
"Bend Ya"	2012	Mann, Frank Ocean	—N/a
"Scars N Stars"	2012	Colin Munroe, Ab-Soul	Unsung Hero
"100"	2012	Big Sean, Royce da 5'9", James Fauntleroy II	Detroit
"Highway to Hell"	2012	DJ Kay Slay, Schoolboy Q, Jay Rock	Return of the Gate Keeper
"Street Justice"	2012	Mr. Smith, Lovely Jean	—N/a
"My Way"	2012	DJ Drama, Common, Lloyd	Quality Street Music
"Thank You"	2012	Scoe	Tha Influence
"I Remember"	2012	Skeme, Bryan Roberts	Alive & Living
"Cryin' Wolf"	2012	ZZ Ward	Til the Casket Drops
"Cross-Trainers"	2012	Pac Div, Blu	GMB
"Focus"	2012	Ras Kass, PorVerb	Barmageddon
"Lyrical Gangsta"	2012	DJ Kay Slay, Papoose	Grown Man Hip-Hop
"Murder"	2012	The Game, Scarface	—N/a
"See No Evil"	2012	The Game, Tank	Jesus Piece
"1 Train"	2013	ASAP Rocky, Big K.R.I.T., Joey Badass, Yelawolf, Action Bronson, Danny Brown	Long. Live. ASAP
"Murda"	2013	Dope Boy, Scoe	ESKO
"Next to Me (Remix)"	2013	Emeli Sandé	—N/a
"Live in My Bed"	2013	Frank Anthony	—N/a
"Ballin'"	2013	Bow Wow, Jay Rock	Greenlight 5
"Sail (TDE Remix)"	2013	Awolnation, Ab-Soul	Megalithic Symphony (Deluxe Version)
"Watts R.I.O.T."	2013	Gee Watts	Watts Up
"I Want It All"	2013	B. Martin, Juicy J	—N/a
"R.I.P. (Remix)"	2013	Young Jeezy, Chris Brown, YG	—N/a
"Solo Dolo Part II"	2013	Kid Cudi	Indicud
"When the Day Breaks"	2013	C-Nice	—N/a
"Better Off"	2013	Quadron	Avalanche
"Two Presidents"	2013	YG Hootie	Destroy & Rebuild
"You're Not a Model"	2013	Shorty Bang	Overdue
"Crime"	2013	Mayer Hawthorne	Where Does This Door Go
"Paper Birds"	2013	Meek DeMeo	Capital Vices
"100 Favors"	2013	Birdman, Detail	Rich Gang
"Triangle Ship"	2013	Terrace Martin	3ChordFold
"Love Game"	2013	Eminem	The Marshall Mathers LP 2
"Stay Ready (What a Life)"	2013	Jhené Aiko	Sail Out
"Winner Circle"	2013	Kanin	Old School New Sense
"Backwards"	2014	Tame Impala	Divergent: Original Motion Picture Soundtrack
"Really Be (Smokin' N Drinkin')"	2014	YG	My Krazy Life
"Babylon"	2014	SZA	Z
"Kendrick Lamar's Interlude"	2014	Ab-Soul	These Days...
"Holy Ghost (Remix)"	2014	Young Jeezy	—N/a
"Drugs on the Schoolyard"	2014	Blue the Misfit	Child in the Wild
"Go Off"	2014	Reek da Villain, Ace Hood, Swizz Beatz	—N/a
"Do Yo Gudda (Remix)"	2014	Hitta J3, Problem, YG	—N/a
"Autumn Leaves"	2014	Chris Brown	X
"Heaven Help Dem"	2015	Jonathan Emile	The Lover / Fighter Document LP
"I'm Ya Dogg"	2015	Snoop Dogg, Rick Ross	Bush
"Classic Man" (Remix)	2015	Jidenna	Wondaland Presents: The Eephus
"Money Over Love"	2015	Bilal	In Another Life
"Genocide"	2015	Dr. Dre, Marsha Ambrosius, Candice Pillay	Compton
"Darkside / Gone"	2015	Dr. Dre, King Mez, Marsha Ambrosius	Compton
"Deep Water"	2015	Dr. Dre, Justus	Compton
"Easy Bake"	2015	Jay Rock, SZA	90059
"On Me"	2015	The Game	The Documentary 2
"LA"	2015	Ty Dolla Sign, Brandy, James Fauntleroy	Free TC
"The New Cupid"	2016	BJ the Chicago Kid	In My Mind
"Wat's Wrong"	2016	Isaiah Rashad, Zacari	The Sun's Tirade
"God Is Fair, Sexy Nasty"	2016	Mac Miller	The Divine Feminine
"Survive"	2016	Mistah F.A.B., Crooked I	Son of a Pimp, Pt. 2
"Sidewalks"	2016	The Weeknd	Starboy
"Conrad Tokyo"	2016	A Tribe Called Quest	We Got It from Here... Thank You 4 Your Service
"Walk on By"	2017	Thundercat	Drunk
"The City"	2017	YG Hootie	Hubris
"Mask Off" (Remix)	2017	Future	Future
"Yeah Right"	2017	Vince Staples, Kučka	Big Fish Theory
"Cold Summer"	2017	DJ Kay Slay, Mac Miller, Kevin Gates, Rell	The Big Brother
"Power"	2017	Rapsody, Lance Skiiiwalker	Laila's Wisdom
"Kites"	2017	N.E.R.D, M.I.A.	No One Ever Really Dies
"American Dream"	2017	Jeezy, J. Cole	Pressure
"Hustla's Story"	2018	Cozz	Effected
"Wow Freestyle"	2018	Jay Rock	Redemption
"Something Dirty / Pic Got Us"	2018	Swizz Beatz, Styles P, Jadakiss	Poison
"Mona Lisa"	2018	Lil Wayne	Tha Carter V
"The Mantra"	2018	Mike WiLL Made-It, Pharrell	Creed II: The Album
"Momma I Hit a Lick"	2019	2 Chainz	Rap or Go to the League
"Under the Sun"	2019	J. Cole, DaBaby, Lute	Revenge of the Dreamers III
"Nile"	2019	Beyoncé	The Lion King: The Gift
"Rearview"	2019	Raphael Saadiq	Jimmy Lee
"Look Over Your Shoulder"	2020	Busta Rhymes	Extinction Level Event 2: The Wrath of God
"Drones"	2021	Terrace Martin, Ty Dolla Sign, Snoop Dogg, James Fauntleroy	Drones
"Range Brothers"	2021	Baby Keem	The Melodic Blue
"Mojo Jojo"	2025	Playboi Carti	Music
"Backd00r"	2025	Playboi Carti, Jhené Aiko	Music
"Good Credit"	2025	Playboi Carti	Music
"Good Flirts"	2026	Baby Keem, Momo Boyd	Ca$ino
"House Money"	2026	Baby Keem, Denzel Curry	Ca$ino
"How to Pray"	2026	Dahi, Amber Mark	Black Boy (Alternative)
"So Good"	2026	Jhené Aiko	Westside Whimsy

== Production discography ==
List of production and songwriting credits (excluding guest appearances, interpolations, and samples)
Track(s)	Year	Credit	Artist(s)	Album
"Tell Yo Mama"	2007	Songwriter	Jay Rock	Non-album single
14. "They Be on It"	2011	Songwriter	Jay Rock	Follow Me Home
"All Day" (featuring Theophilus London, Allan Kingdom and Paul McCartney)	2015	Songwriter	Kanye West	Non-album single
16. "Overtime"; (featuring Justine Skye and Miguel)	2016	Songwriter	Schoolboy Q	Blank Face LP
4. "Untitled 04 | 08.14.2014."	2016	Producer (with Thundercat and Sounwave)	Kendrick Lamar	Untitled Unmastered
—N/a	2018	Executive producer	Kendrick Lamar, various artists	Black Panther: The Album
1. "Black Panther"	2018	Producer (with Sounwave and Cubeatz)	Kendrick Lamar	Black Panther: The Album
4. "The Ways"	2018	Producer (with Sounwave and BadBadNotGood)	Khalid, Swae Lee	Black Panther: The Album
6. "I Am"	2018	Producer (with Sounwave)	Jorja Smith	Black Panther: The Album
8. "Bloody Waters"	2018	Producer (with Sounwave and Robin Hannibal)	Ab-Soul, Anderson .Paak, James Blake	Black Panther: The Album
10. "Redemption Interlude"	2018	Producer (with Baby Keem)	Zacari	Black Panther: The Album
12. "Seasons"	2018	Producer (with Sounwave and Frank Dukes)	Mozzy, Sjava, Reason	Black Panther: The Album
3. "Chopstix"	2019	Songwriter	Schoolboy Q, Travis Scott	Crash Talk
4. "Numb Numb Juice"	2019	Songwriter	Schoolboy Q	Crash Talk
5. "Drunk"; (featuring 6lack)	2019	Additional vocals, songwriter	Schoolboy Q	Crash Talk
7. "5200"	2019	Additional vocals, songwriter	Schoolboy Q	Crash Talk
9. "Floating"; (featuring 21 Savage)	2019	Songwriter	Schoolboy Q	Crash Talk
12. "Crash"	2019	Songwriter	Schoolboy Q	Crash Talk
15. "Vent"	2021	Additional vocals, songwriter	Baby Keem	The Melodic Blue
1. "United in Grief"	2022	Producer (with Sounwave, J. Lbs, Duval Timothy, Beach Noise and Tim Maxey)	Kendrick Lamar	Mr. Morale & the Big Steppers
10. "Count Me Out"	2022	Producer (with Sounwave, DJ Dahi, J. Lbs and Tim Maxey)	Kendrick Lamar	Mr. Morale & the Big Steppers
13. "Savior (Interlude)"	2022	Producer (with Sounwave and J. Lbs)	Kendrick Lamar	Mr. Morale & the Big Steppers
14. "Savior"; (with Baby Keem and Sam Dew)	2022	Producer (with Cardo, J. Lbs, Sounwave, Mario Luciano and Rascal)	Kendrick Lamar	Mr. Morale & the Big Steppers
2. "Squabble Up"	2024	Producer (with Sounwave, Jack Antonoff, Scott Bridgeway and M-Tech)	Kendrick Lamar	GNX
6. "Reincarnated"	2024	Producer (with Sounwave, Jack Antonoff, M-Tech and Noah Ehler)	Kendrick Lamar	GNX
5. "House Money"	2026	Songwriter	Baby Keem	Casino
—N/a	2026	Co-executive producer	AZ Chike	No Rest for the Wicked

== See also ==
- "6:16 in LA"
- "Watch the Party Die"
- List of artists by number of Canadian number-one singles (RPM)
- List of artists who reached number one on the Australian singles chart
- List of artists who reached number one in the United States
- List of artists who have achieved simultaneous number-one single and album in the United States
- List of Billboard Hot 100 chart achievements and milestones
