= Chopstix =

Chopstix may refer to:

- Chopsticks
- "Chopstix" (song), by Schoolboy Q and Travis Scott, 2019
- Chopstix, Nigerian record producer born Olagundoye James Malcom
