= Yeern 101 =

2024 single by Schoolboy Q

Single by Schoolboy Q

from the album Blue Lips
- Released: February 15, 2024
- Genre: Hip hop
- Length: 2:20
- Label: TDE; Interscope
- Songwriters: Quincy Hanley; Ronald LaTour Jr.
- Producers: Cardo; Johnny Juliano; Yung Exclusive; J.LBS; Andrew Boyd (vocal); Bert Gervis (vocal); Julian Santos (vocal)

Schoolboy Q singles chronology
"Soccer Dad" (2022)	"Yeern 101" (2024)

Music video
- "Yeern 101" on YouTube

"Yeern 101" is a song by American rapper Schoolboy Q, released on February 15, 2024, as the lead single from his sixth studio album, Blue Lips (2024). It was produced by Cardo, Johnny Juliano, Yung Exclusive and J.LBS, with vocal production from Andrew Boyd, Bert Gervis and Julian Santos.

== Composition ==
"Yeern 101" is a hip hop song with production that "slightly blends EDM elements" and contains a "twitchy, anxiously clipped" bass drum loop, over which Schoolboy Q details his background in Los Angeles and drastic changes in his life around the time, as well as his wealthy lifestyle and current status in the rap music industry. The song has no chorus.

== Critical reception ==
Zachary Horvath of HotNewHipHop gave a positive review, writing the song "features Q rapping his behind off like the rent was due. Cardo handles the production and brings a rumbling beat that has a big presence to it that is not too overwhelming on the ears." Sophie Caraan of Hypebeast described the song as an "adventurous offering that hears Q go hard on the beat from the get go."

== Music video ==
The music video was released alongside the single and directed by Schoolboy Q and James Edward. It sees Schoolboy Q walking the red carpet, at an event in casual clothes in contrast to the surrounding formal wear, playing golf, driving in a Volkswagen Beetle with his crew through different sets in a film production studio, briefly depicted in a cartoon and taking a walk in the rain. The clip ends with a person sweeping up lots of smashed glass on the studio floor as Q rides around on a bicycle.

== Charts ==
Chart performance for "Yeern 101"
Chart (2024)	Peak position
New Zealand Hot Singles (RMNZ)	32
US Bubbling Under Hot 100 (Billboard)	25
