= Blue Lips (Schoolboy Q album) =

2024 studio album by Schoolboy Q

Studio album by Schoolboy Q
- Released: March 1, 2024
- Recorded: April 2019 – 2023
- Studios: TDE, Los Angeles, California
- Length: 56:10
- Labels: TDE; Interscope
- Producers: The Alchemist; Beat Butcha; Cardo; Childish Major; DJ Khalil; Devin Malik; Flip_00; Frollen Music Library; Fu; J.LBS; J. Mo; Jason Wool; Johnny Juliano; Kal Banx; LowTheGreat; Mario Luciano; Mike Hector; Oren Yoel; Por Vida; Q; Sam Barsh; TaeBeast; WillGell; Uzimaki; YeX; Yung Exclusive

Schoolboy Q chronology
Crash Talk (2019)	Blue Lips (2024)	Thank Que (TBA)

Singles from Blue Lips
- 1. "Yeern 101" Released: February 15, 2024

Blue Lips is the sixth studio album by American rapper Schoolboy Q. It was released on March 1, 2024, through Top Dawg Entertainment and distributed by Interscope Records. The album features guest appearances from Ab-Soul, AzChike, Childish Major, Devin Malik, Freddie Gibbs, Jozzy, Lance Skiiwalker, and Rico Nasty. It marks his first studio album release in five years, since 2019's Crash Talk.

Despite being less commercially successful than his previous albums, Blue Lips received widespread acclaim from music critics, with most considering it his best work to date. The album debuted at number 13 on the US Billboard 200 chart. It was supported by the lead single "Yeern 101".

== Background ==
Following the release of Crash Talk (2019), the rapper first promised the follow-up record to his fifth studio album during a concert in January 2020. However, he would not release original solo material until April 2022, with the single "Soccer Dad". First specific updates about an upcoming project arrived on June 6, 2023, when the rapper revealed that his next album was "in the mixing process" at the time and a release would be "coming very very soon". In September 2023, he elaborated on his decision of not releasing albums as frequently as others by clarifying that he does not view "it as a sport" but instead wants to move off "peace" and his "experiences". He previously promised a return "this year" on August 29.

== Release and promotion ==
On February 1, 2024, Q set up a countdown finishing on March 1 on his website, alongside the display of the album title. He also released a trailer that plays an "atmospheric beat" and showcases the "dictionary definition" of the title Blue Lips. Also included in the 37-second video is a tracklist, consisting of 17 tracks, projected on a "film-studio wall". It was also revealed that Q would start previewing the album every Tuesday and Thursday leading up to the album.

On February 6, Q released music videos for the songs "Blueslides" and the Devin Malik-assisted "Back n Love", being classified as "album previews" that were not released on digital streaming platforms. Q would also post mini-vlogs on his social media platforms, as well as his YouTube channel, on February 8 and 13 respectively. On February 15, the official lead single "Yeern 101" was released with an accompanying music video. The album cover was revealed the next day, with preorders for the album's merchandise also going up, including physical (vinyl and CD) copies of the album. On February 20, Q continued sharing "album previews", releasing music videos for the songs "Cooties" and the Devin Malik / Lance Skiiiwalker-assisted "Love Birds".

== Critical reception ==
Professional ratings
Aggregate scores
Source	Rating
Metacritic	87/100
Review scores
Source	Rating
AllMusic	4.5/5 stars
Clash	8/10
HipHopDX	4.5/5
Pitchfork	8.3/10
Rolling Stone	4/5 stars
Slant Magazine	3.5/5 stars
Sputnikmusic	4.0/5

Blue Lips was met with widespread critical acclaim. At Metacritic, which assigns a rating out of 100 to reviews from professional publications, the album received a weighted average score of 87, based on seven reviews.

Karan Singh of HipHopDX wrote: "whereas a lot of listeners might be tempted to ask themselves if ScHoolboy Q's latest offering was worth the wait, his remarkable growth also suggests that years of experience is perhaps what births the richest music, especially in a word-heavy genre like rap". Dylan Green of Pitchfork wrote: "few MCs, on his label or elsewhere, are capable of firing in so many different directions and hitting this many targets at once without sounding out of their depth, but Q corrals the ups and downs of his lavish lifestyle into a deliriously entertaining joyride". Robin Murray of Clash resumed: "part of why Blue Lips is compelling is that it seduces the listener enough to accept Schoolboy Q on his own terms". Benjamin Jack of Sputnikmusic gave a positive review, stating, "Back with a bang so refined it's positively deafening, Blue Lips is an intriguing, befuddling, unique collection of songs that signals the start of a new era for ScHoolboy Q: the man who survived the CrasH".

Rolling Stone's Mosi Reeves wrote that the album "represents a moment when listeners can fully appreciate Q for his singular ability to craft compelling, thought-provoking gems" without comparing him to ex-labelmate Kendrick Lamar. Paul Attard of Slant Magazine found the album "epitomizes what a return to form should strive for: to serve as a reminder of past greatness, yes, but to also be a bold departure from what's come before, embracing risks and pushing boundaries, even if it occasionally teeters on the edge of excess".

=== Year-end lists ===
Select year-end rankings of Blue Lips
Publication	List	Rank	Ref.
Exclaim!	Exclaim!'s 50 Best Albums of 2024	31	
Time Out	The Best Albums of 2024	10	

== Track listing ==
Blue Lips track listing
No.	Title	Writer(s)	Producer(s)	Length
1.	"Funny Guy"	Quincy Matthew Hanley; Jason Pounds; Donte Perkins; Charles Hemphill	J. Mo; J.LBS; TaeBeast	2:38
2.	"Pop" (featuring Rico Nasty)	Hanley; Maria-Cecilia Simone Kelly; Jocelyn Donald; Eliot Dubock; Mario Luciano; Matthew Day; Perkins	Beat Butcha; Fu; Mario Luciano; TaeBeast; Amaire Johnson^{[a]}; J.LBS^{[a]}; Kal Banx^{[a]}; Skhye Hutch^{[a]}	3:17
3.	"Thank God 4 Me"	Hanley; Derrick Ordogne; Dion Norman; Jordan Houston; Paul Beauregard; Todd Shaw; Kalon Berry; Pounds	Kal Banx; J.LBS; Fu^{[a]}	2:57
4.	"Blueslides"	Hanley; Perkins; Luciano; Jason Wool	TaeBeast; Luciano; Wool; J.LBS	3:55
5.	"Yeern 101"	Hanley; Ronald LaTour Jr.	Cardo; Johnny Juliano; Yung Exclusive; J.LBS; Andrew Boyd^{[v]}; Bert Gervis^{[v]}; Julian Santos^{[v]}	2:20
6.	"Love Birds" (featuring Devin Malik and Lance Skiiiwalker)	Hanley; Devin Williams; Alejandro Garcia; Joshua Lane; Oren Yoel; Salvador Samano	Devin Malik; Yoel; J.LBS; Johnson^{[a]}; Hutch^{[a]}	3:55
7.	"Movie" (featuring AzChike)	Hanley; Damaria Walker; Perkins; Mike Hector	LowTheGreat; TaeBeast; J.LBS; Hector	1:54
8.	"Cooties"	Hanley; Perkins; Luciano; Wool	Uzimaki; TaeBeast; Luciano; Wool; Yoel^{[a]}; Juice of All Trades^{[a]}; Jordan Brooks^{[a]}; Santos^{[v]}	2:53
9.	"Ohio" (featuring Freddie Gibbs)	Hanley; Fredrick Tipton; Williams; Pounds; LaTour	TaeBeast; Luciano; Wool; J.LBS; Cardo; Juliano; Malik; Q; YeX; Por Vida	4:51
10.	"Foux" (featuring Ab-Soul)	Hanley; Herbert Anthony Stevens IV; Perkins; Luciano; Wool	TaeBeast; Luciano; Wool	4:42
11.	"First"	Hanley; LaTour; Williams; Yoel	Cardo; Juliano; Malik; Yoel; YeX; TaeBeast^{[a]}	4:06
12.	"NuNu"	Hanley; Daniel Seeff; Markus Randle; Khalil Abdul-Rahman	Childish Major; DJ Khalil; Malik^{[a]}	2:47
13.	"Back n Love" (featuring Devin Malik)	Hanley; Williams; Gil Scott-Heron; Perkins; William Gella	TaeBeast; WillGell; Santos^{[v]}	3:51
14.	"Lost Times" (featuring Jozzy)	Hanley; Donald; Day; Alan Daniel Maman	The Alchemist; Fu; Santos^{[v]}	2:53
15.	"Germany 86'"	Hanley; Perkins; Jackie Members; Richard Poindexter; Robert Poindexter	TaeBeast; Sam Barsh; Uzimaki; Luciano^{[a]}; Wool^{[a]}	2:07
16.	"Time Killers"	Hanley; Pounds	J.LBS; Santos^{[v]}	2:37
17.	"Pig Feet" (featuring Childish Major)	Hanley; Randle; Perkins; Berry; Jiseok Lee	TaeBeast; Kal Banx; Flip_00; Luciano^{[a]}; Johnson^{[a]}; Fu^{[a]}; Santos^{[v]}	3:15
18.	"Smile"	Hanley; Williams; Darvid Thor; Henry Jenkins; Hudson Whitlock	Malik; Frollen Music Library; Boyd^{[v]}; Gervis^{[v]}; Santos^{[v]}	1:12
Total length:				56:10

Notes

- ^{^[a]} signifies an additional producer
- ^{^[v]} signifies a vocal producer

Sample credits

- "Germany 86" contains a sample of "Love Brought You Here" which was originally recorded by Pat Johnson.

== Personnel ==
Credits adapted from official liner notes.

Musicians

- Schoolboy Q – rap vocals
- Rico Nasty – vocals (track 2)
- Lauren Santi – additional vocals (tracks 4, 10)
- Marcus Paul – trumpet (track 4)
- Lance Skiiiwalker – additional vocals (track 6)
- Sir – additional vocals (track 6)
- Devin Malik – vocals (tracks 6, 13)
- AzChike – rap vocals (track 7)
- Jordan Brooks – bass (tracks 8, 14)
- Childish Major – additional vocals (tracks 9, 12), vocals (17)
- Freddie Gibbs – vocals (track 9)
- Ab-Soul – rap vocals (track 10)
- Jozzy – vocals (track 14)
- Sam Barsh – keyboards (track 15)
- Jairus Mozee – guitar (track 16)

Technical

- Vic Luevanos – mastering, mixing
- Julian Santos – mixing (tracks 1–3, 5–18), engineering (all tracks)
- Julio Ulloa – mixing assistance
- Jeffery "Champ" Massey – mixing assistance (tracks 1–3, 5–18)
- Paul Montes – mixing assistance (track 2)
- Arnie Reyes III – engineering assistance (track 5)
- Devin Ragsdale – engineering assistance (track 5)
- Jhair Lazo – mixing assistance (track 9)
- Derek "Mixedby" Ali – mixing

== Charts ==
=== Weekly charts ===
Weekly chart performance for Blue Lips
Chart (2024)	Peak position
Australian Albums (ARIA)	72
Australian Hip Hop/R&B Albums (ARIA)	20
Belgian Albums (Ultratop Flanders)	113
Belgian Albums (Ultratop Wallonia)	186
Canadian Albums (Billboard)	33
French Albums (SNEP)	128
New Zealand Albums (RMNZ)	18
Portuguese Albums (AFP)	88
Swiss Albums (Schweizer Hitparade)	26
UK Album Downloads (Official Charts)	45
UK R&B Albums (Official Charts)	22
US Billboard 200	13
US Top R&B/Hip-Hop Albums (Billboard)	6

=== Year-end charts ===
Year-end chart performance for Blue Lips
Chart (2024)	Position
US Top R&B/Hip-Hop Albums (Billboard)	99
