= Crash Talk =

Studio album by Schoolboy Q
- Released: April 26, 2019
- Studios: Encore (Burbank); Interscope (Santa Monica); Record Plant (Hollywood); Sony ATV (Sydney)
- Genre: Hip hop
- Length: 39:45
- Labels: TDE; Interscope
- Producers: Baby Keem; Bekon; Boi-1da; Cardo; DJ Dahi; DJ Fu; G Koop; Illmind; Jake One; JBo; Johnny Juliano; Nez & Rio; Sounwave; Yung Exclusive

Schoolboy Q chronology
Blank Face LP (2016)	Crash Talk (2019)	Blue Lips (2024)

Singles from Crash Talk
- 1. "Numb Numb Juice" Released: March 13, 2019; 2. "Chopstix" Released: April 8, 2019; 3. "Floating" Released: June 11, 2019

Crash Talk (stylized as CrasH Talk) is the fifth studio album by American rapper Schoolboy Q, released on April 26, 2019, through Top Dawg Entertainment and distributed by Interscope Records. The album features guest appearances from Travis Scott, 6lack, Ty Dolla Sign, YG, 21 Savage, Kid Cudi, and Lil Baby. It was supported by three singles: "Numb Numb Juice", "Chopstix", and "Floating".

Crash Talk received generally positive reviews from critics and debuted at number three on the US Billboard 200. It is Schoolboy Q's third US top 10 album.

== Background ==
In February 2017, in an interview with Zane Lowe on Beats 1, Schoolboy Q revealed that his new album was close to completion and the direction he wanted to go with the album, explaining;

It's [more so] my life after I made it to the point of ScHoolboy Q. I gave you me, but I never gave you the other side of me: the father, the dude that's actually happy, the dude that doesn't be in the hood just hanging out. The dude that's trying to put his homies in position now. I'm not a deadbeat father anymore.

On September 26, 2017, Q shared an update on his forthcoming album, saying the album was 90 percent completed. However, on July 31, 2018, Top Dawg Entertainment's CEO Anthony "Top Dawg" Tiffith announced on Twitter that Schoolboy Q's next album was 90 to 95 percent complete, contrary to Q's statement.

In September 2018, Q announced that he delayed his album, originally scheduled for a November 2018 release, following the death of frequent collaborator and friend, Mac Miller. On April 15, 2019, the album's title and release date were revealed.

== Artwork ==
The album's artwork features a somber comic book-type illustration of Schoolboy Q with a paper bag over his head while dollar bills cover his hoodie. The artwork was painted by Blue the Great.

== Singles ==
The album's lead single, "Numb Numb Juice", was released for digital download on March 13, 2019. The song was produced by Hykeem Carter, DJ Fu, Nez & Rio. The music video was released on March 13, 2019. The music video was directed by Dave Free and Jack Begert. The song peaked at number 55 on the US Billboard Hot 100.

The album's second single, "Chopstix", was released on April 8, 2019. The song was produced by DJ Dahi. The music video was released on April 10, 2019. The music video was directed by Nabil.

"Floating" featuring 21 Savage, was sent to rhythmic contemporary radio on June 11, 2019, as the album's third single. It peaked at number 67 on the Billboard Hot 100 following the album's first week of release.

=== Promotional ===
The lead promotional single, "Crash", was released on April 24, 2019.

== Critical reception ==
Professional ratings
Aggregate scores
Source	Rating
Metacritic	69/100
Review scores
Source	Rating
AllMusic	3.5/5 stars
Exclaim!	7/10
Highsnobiety	3.5/5
HipHopDX	3.4/5
HotNewHipHop	76%
NME	4/5 stars
Pitchfork	6.7/10
Pretty Much Amazing	C+

Crash Talk was met with generally positive reviews. At Metacritic, which assigns a normalized rating out of 100 to reviews from professional publications, the album received an average score of 69, based on seven reviews.

Kyann-Sian Williams of NME gave a positive review, stating "The album's slower tempo won't be for everyone: if you're all thrills, no substance, then maybe this album is not for you. But you have to respect ScHoolboy Q's dedication to showing us a different outlook on life, and exploring many emotions. Introspective—yes, but these are songs for the summer." Kyle Mullin of Exclaim! said, "From those raw, candid lyrics, to ScHoolboy's increasing pop acumen, CrasH Talk reveals many sides of an increasingly (and compellingly) unpredictable MC." Andy Kellman of AllMusic saying "At 40 minutes, this is easily Q's leanest LP. It would be meaner with the removal of the inane Travis Scott collaboration "CHopstix", the uncharacteristic single." HipHopDX critic Scott Glaysher said, "There are without doubt a few tracks on this album that could make it to your favorite ScHoolboy playlist but said "few" don't outweigh the remaining dozen that fall flat on their blank face." Alphonse Pierre of Pitchfork stated, "CrasH Talk might not have the mean-mugging raps of Blank Face LP or the weed-infused smoker anthems of Habits & Contradictions, but it's comforting, like diving into the fifth or sixth season of your favorite network sitcom."

In a mixed review, Pretty Much Amazing's Marshall Gu stated: "DJ Dahi, Sounwave and Cardo handle the bulk of beats here, with additional help from ScHoolboy staples Nez & Rio, plus the venerable Boi-1da and Jake One. Except the results are less Damn and more Redemption, the Jay Rock album from last year that everyone has already forgotten."

== Commercial performance ==
Crash Talk debuted at number three on the US Billboard 200 chart, moving 81,000 album-equivalent units (including pure album sales of 18,000 copies) in its first week. It is Schoolboy Q's third US top 10 album. In its second week, the album dropped to number seven on the chart, earning an additional 33,000 album-equivalent units that week.

== Track listing ==
Crash Talk track listing
No.	Title	Writer(s)	Producer(s)	Length
1.	"Gang Gang"	Quincy Hanley; Matthew Day; Justin Garner	DJ Fu; JBo	2:15
2.	"Tales"	Hanley; Dacoury Natche; Jacob Dutton; Robert Mandell	DJ Dahi; Jake One; G Koop	2:53
3.	"Chopstix" (with Travis Scott)	Hanley; Jacques Webster II; Kendrick Duckworth; Natche	DJ Dahi	3:00
4.	"Numb Numb Juice"	Hanley; Hykeem Carter, Jr.; Duckworth; Day; Nesbitt Wesonga, Jr.; Mario Loving	Baby Keem; DJ Fu; Nez & Rio	1:47
5.	"Drunk" (featuring 6lack)	Hanley; Ricardo Valentine; Duckworth; Mark Spears; Natche; Daniel Tannenbaum	Sounwave; DJ Dahi; Bekon	3:32
6.	"Lies" (featuring Ty Dolla Sign and YG)	Hanley; Tyrone Griffin; Keenon Jackson; Spears; Carter, Jr.	Baby Keem; Sounwave	2:51
7.	"5200"	Hanley; Spears; Duckworth; Ramon Ibanga, Jr.	Sounwave; Illmind	3:31
8.	"Black Folk"	Hanley; Natche; Dutton	DJ Dahi; Jake One	2:27
9.	"Floating" (featuring 21 Savage)	Hanley; Roland LaTour; Johnny Juliano; Shéyaa Bin Abraham-Joseph; Duckworth	Cardo; Juliano	3:06
10.	"Dangerous" (featuring Kid Cudi)	Hanley; Scott Mescudi; Natche	DJ Dahi	2:30
11.	"Die Wit Em"	Hanley; LaTour; Juliano; Daveon Jackson	Cardo; Juliano; Yung Exclusive	3:09
12.	"Crash"	Hanley; Matthew Samuels; Duckworth	Boi-1da	2:41
13.	"Water" (featuring Lil Baby)	Hanley; LaTour; Juliano; Dominique Jones	Cardo; Juliano	2:42
14.	"Attention"	Hanley; Wesonga; Loving	Nez & Rio	3:21
Total length:				39:45

Notes

- Tracks 3 and 12 are stylized with the capital letter "H". For example, "Chopstix" is stylized as "CHopstix" and "Crash" is stylized as "CrasH".
- "Gang Gang" features additional vocals by Zacari
- "Drunk" features additional vocals by Kendrick Lamar and Kid Cudi
- "5200" features additional vocals by Kendrick Lamar
- "Crash" features additional vocals by Mac Miller
- "Water" features additional vocals by Cardo

Sample credits

- "Crash" contains a sample from "Boom", written by Ryan Montgomery and Christopher Martin, as performed by Royce da 5'9".

== Personnel ==
Credits adapted from Tidal.

Technical

- Aria Angel Ali – mixing (tracks 3, 4)
- Cyrus "NOIS" Taghipour – mixing (tracks 3)
- Derek "MixedByAli" Ali – mixing (tracks 3, 4)

== Charts ==
=== Weekly charts ===
Chart performance for Crash Talk
Chart (2019)	Peak position
Australian Albums (ARIA)	11
Austrian Albums (Ö3 Austria)	29
Belgian Albums (Ultratop Flanders)	17
Belgian Albums (Ultratop Wallonia)	62
Canadian Albums (Billboard)	5
Danish Albums (Hitlisten)	18
Dutch Albums (Album Top 100)	14
Finnish Albums (Suomen virallinen lista)	17
French Albums (SNEP)	50
German Albums (Offizielle Top 100)	47
Irish Albums (IRMA)	22
Italian Albums (FIMI)	91
Latvian Albums (LAIPA)	3
Lithuanian Albums (AGATA)	2
New Zealand Albums (RMNZ)	6
Norwegian Albums (VG-lista)	5
Swedish Albums (Sverigetopplistan)	27
Swiss Albums (Schweizer Hitparade)	17
UK Albums (Official Charts)	27
US Billboard 200	3
US Top R&B/Hip-Hop Albums (Billboard)	1

=== Year-end charts ===
2019 year-end chart performance for Crash Talk
Chart (2019)	Position
US Billboard 200	180
US Top R&B/Hip-Hop Albums (Billboard)	73

== Certifications ==
Certifications for Crash Talk
Region	Certification	Certified units/sales
United States (RIAA)	Gold	500,000^{‡}
^{‡} Sales+streaming figures based on certification alone.
