= Floating (Schoolboy Q song) =

Song by Schoolboy Q featuring 21 Savage

Single by ScHoolboy Q and 21 Savage

from the album CrasH Talk
- Released: June 11, 2019
- Genre: Hip hop; trap
- Length: 3:06
- Label: TDE; Interscope
- Songwriters: Quincy Hanley; Ronald LaTour; Johnny Juliano; Shéyaa Bin Abraham-Joseph; Kendrick Duckworth
- Producers: Cardo; Juliano

Schoolboy Q singles chronology
"Chopstix" (2019)	"Floating" (2019)	"Chase the Money" (2019)

21 Savage singles chronology
"100 Bands" (2019)	"Floating" (2019)	"Motivation (Savage Remix)" (2019)

Music video
- "Floating ft. 21 Savage" on YouTube

"Floating" is a song by American rapper Schoolboy Q featuring Atlanta-based rapper 21 Savage from the former's fifth studio album Crash Talk (2019). It was sent to rhythmic contemporary radio on June 11, 2019, as the album's third single. The song was produced by Cardo and Johnny Juliano.

== Music video ==
The music video was uploaded onto Schoolboy Q's Vevo channel on YouTube on May 15, 2019. It was directed by Jack Berget and Dave Free. In it, Schoolboy Q takes the audience on a tour to Los Angeles, and stop motion effect is used throughout the visual. 21 Savage does not appear in the video.

== Charts ==
Chart (2019)	Peak position
Canada Hot 100 (Billboard)	56
New Zealand Hot Singles (RMNZ)	5
US Billboard Hot 100	67
US Hot R&B/Hip-Hop Songs (Billboard)	25

== Certifications ==
Region	Certification	Certified units/sales
New Zealand (RMNZ)	Gold	15,000^{‡}
United States (RIAA)	Platinum	1,000,000^{‡}
^{‡} Sales+streaming figures based on certification alone.
