= Numb Numb Juice =

2019 song by Schoolboy Q

Single by Schoolboy Q

from the album Crash Talk
- Released: March 13, 2019
- Genre: Hip hop; trap
- Length: 1:47
- Label: TDE; Interscope
- Songwriters: Quincy Hanley; Kendrick Duckworth; Hykeem Carter, Jr.; Mathew Day; Nesbitt Wesonga, Jr.; Mario Loving
- Producers: Baby Keem; DJ Fu; Nez & Rio

Schoolboy Q singles chronology
"Kill 'Em With Success" (2018)	"Numb Numb Juice" (2019)	"Chopstix" (2019)

Music video
- "Numb Numb Juice" on YouTube

"Numb Numb Juice" is a song by American rapper Schoolboy Q, released on March 13, 2019 as the lead single from his fifth studio album Crash Talk, by Top Dawg Entertainment (TDE) and Interscope Records. The song was produced by Baby Keem, DJ Fu and Nez & Rio.

== Background and composition ==
The song features a "kick and 808-heavy instrumental". Tom Breihan described the song as a "general rage-out full of violent tough talk"; in parts of the song, Schoolboy Q threatens to hop "out like Jack-in-the-Box" and lists a variety of acts he considers "bitch shit". The title of the song is a reference to "num num juice", a Bay Area slang for an alcoholic cocktail.

== Music video ==
The music video was directed by Dave Free and Jack Begert. Released alongside the single, it is noted for its several references to pop culture. The video begins with Schoolboy Q hanging out of a car and painting a red line in the street with a paint roller while driving, which is shown in the single's cover art and a reference to the Seinfeld episode "The Pothole". Schoolboy Q spoofs Elon Musk's interview on The Joe Rogan Experience, in which the rapper smokes and drinks whiskey with a headset on. Two scenes from the film Belly are parodied, the first of which is the opening scene and the second sees rapper Tyler, the Creator playing the role of the character Big Head Rico, wearing a wig and shades and eating a banana. Schoolboy Q also recreates a scene from the music video of "Mo Money Mo Problems" by The Notorious B.I.G. with another man, complete with red leather jackets and red New York Yankees caps. Apart from the pop culture references, Schoolboy Q is seen in a mansion hanging out with models at the pool, as well as facing a rival in a rooftop martial arts fight. Rapper Jay Rock makes a cameo appearance in the video.

== Charts ==
Chart (2019)	Peak position
Australia (ARIA)	70
Canada Hot 100 (Billboard)	55
New Zealand (Recorded Music NZ)	32
US Billboard Hot 100	55
US Hot R&B/Hip-Hop Songs (Billboard)	25

== Certifications ==
Region	Certification	Certified units/sales
New Zealand (RMNZ)	Gold	15,000^{‡}
United States (RIAA)	Platinum	1,000,000^{‡}
^{‡} Sales+streaming figures based on certification alone.
