= Chopstix (song) =

Single by Schoolboy Q and Travis Scott

Single by ScHoolboy Q and Travis Scott

from the album Crash Talk
- Released: April 8, 2019
- Genre: Hip hop; trap
- Length: 3:00
- Label: TDE; Interscope
- Songwriters: Quincy Hanley; Jacques Webster; Kendrick Duckworth; Dacoury Natche
- Producer: DJ Dahi

Schoolboy Q singles chronology
"Numb Numb Juice" (2019)	"Chopstix" (2019)	"Floating" (2019)

Travis Scott singles chronology
"Wake Up" (2019)	"Chopstix" (2019)	"Power Is Power" (2019)

Music video
- "CHopstix" on YouTube

"Chopstix" (stylized as "CHopstix") is a song by American rappers Schoolboy Q and Travis Scott, released on April 8, 2019 by Top Dawg Entertainment (TDE) and Interscope Records. It is the second single from Schoolboy Q's fifth studio album Crash Talk (2019). The song was produced by DJ Dahi.

== Background ==
On September 29, 2018, the song was leaked as part of a larger unauthorized release of TDE material. It had different verses and a guest appearance from Kendrick Lamar, but the feature was replaced by Travis Scott. On March 20, 2019, Schoolboy debuted the song live on The Tonight Show Starring Jimmy Fallon. The song was set to release on April 4, 2019, but it was postponed to April 8 due to the death of Nipsey Hussle. However, it was accidentally uploaded onto Spotify on April 4 but was immediately taken down.

== Composition ==
In the song, the rappers compare a woman's legs to chopsticks, with the utensils being an abstract imagery for sex. Schoolboy Q raps about a romantic encounter, "flexes and salutes the 'five-star' chicks on the melodic track". Travis Scott sings the hook with melodic vocals in Auto-Tune. The song's chorus was written by Kendrick Lamar.

== Charts ==
Chart (2019)	Peak position
Canada Hot 100 (Billboard)	69
New Zealand Hot Singles (RMNZ)	7
US Billboard Hot 100	85
US Hot R&B/Hip-Hop Songs (Billboard)	32

== Certifications ==
Region	Certification	Certified units/sales
United States (RIAA)	Gold	500,000^{‡}
^{‡} Sales+streaming figures based on certification alone.
