= List of songs recorded by Kendrick Lamar =

Songs by American rapper

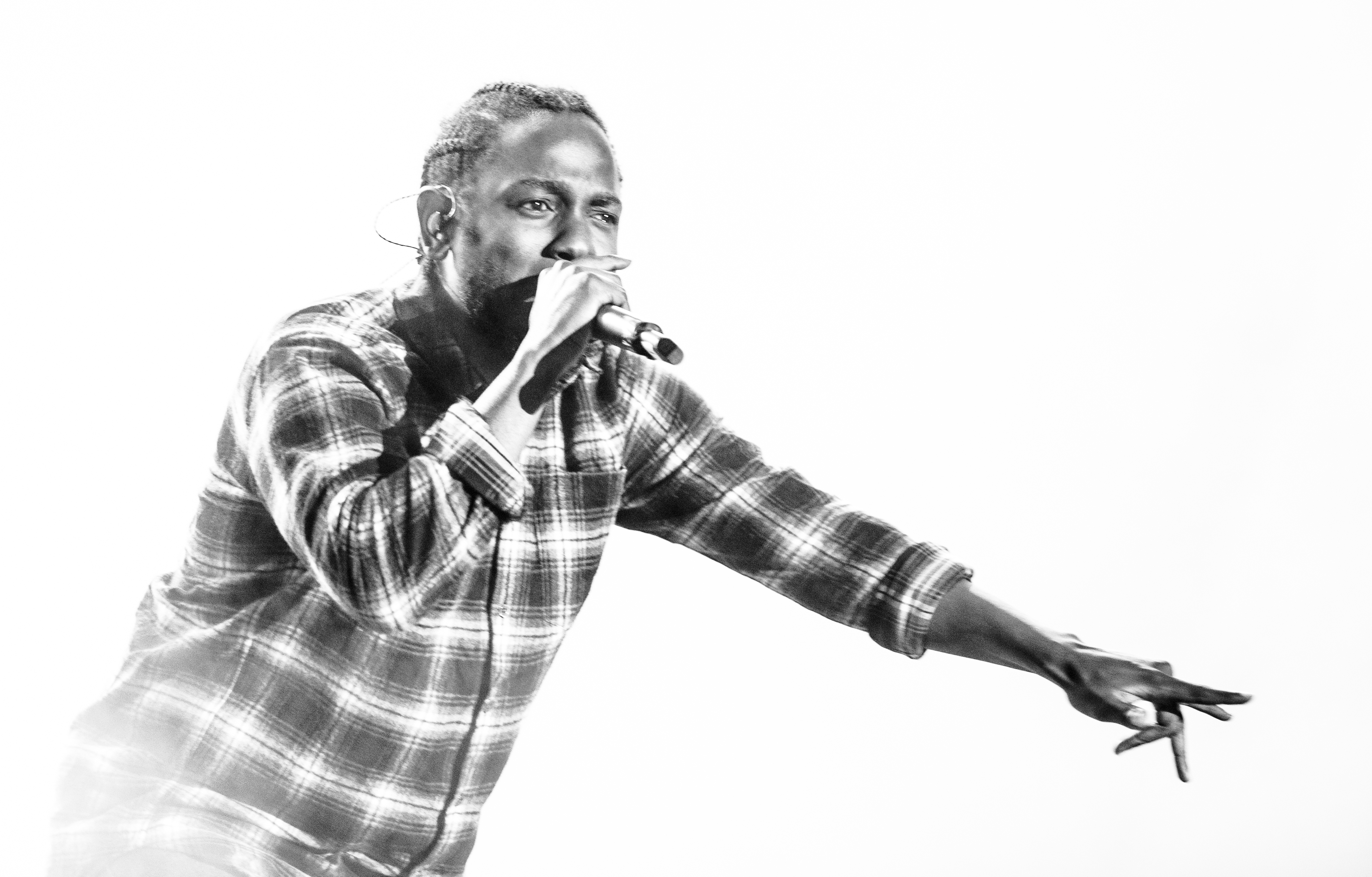
Lamar performing in 2016

This is a list of songs recorded by American rapper Kendrick Lamar.

== Songs ==
Key
†	Indicates single release

Name of song, writer(s), original release, producer(s), and year of release.
Song	Writer(s)	Original release	Producer(s)	Date of Release	Year	Ref.
"6:16 in LA" †	Kendrick Duckworth	—N/a	Sounwave; Jack Antonoff	2024-05-03	2024	
"30 for 30" (with SZA) †	Kendrick Duckworth; Solána Rowe; Robert DeBarge; Michael Uzowuru; Anthony Jermaine White; Greg Williams	SOS Deluxe: Lana	J. White Did It; Michael Uzowuru	2025-01-07	2025	
"Ab-Soul's Outro" (featuring Ab-Soul)	Kendrick Duckworth; Herbert Stevens; Terrace Martin	Section.80	Terrace Martin	2011-07-02	2011	
"A.D.H.D"	Kendrick Duckworth; Mark Spears	Section.80	Sounwave	2011-07-02	2011	
"Alien Girl (Today, W/ Her)"	Kendrick Duckworth; Mark Spears	Overly Dedicated	Sounwave	2010-09-14	2010	
"All the Stars" (with SZA) †	Kendrick Duckworth; Solána Rowe; Mark Spears; Al Shux	Black Panther: The Album	Sounwave	2018-02-09	2018	
"Alright" †	Kendrick Duckworth; Pharrell Williams; Mark Spears	To Pimp a Butterfly	Pharrell Williams; Mark Spears	2015-03-15	2015	
"A Milli"	Kendrick Duckworth	C4	Cha Lo; Bangladesh	2009-01-30	2009	
"The Art of Peer Pressure"	Kendrick Duckworth; Rune Rask; Jonas Vestergaard	good kid, m.A.A.d city	Tabu	2012-10-22	2012	
"Auntie Diaries"	Kendrick Duckworth; Homer Steinweiss; Daniel Krieger; Daniel Tannenbaum; Tyler Mehlenbacher; Sergiu Gherman; Craig Balmoris; Matt Schaeffer; Johnny Kosich; Jake Kosich	Mr. Morale & the Big Steppers	Bekon; The Donuts; Craig Balmoris	2022-05-13	2022	
"Average Joe" (featuring Ab-Soul)	Kendrick Duckworth; Wyatt Coleman	Overly Dedicated	Wyldfyer	2010-09-14	2010	
"Backd00r"	Jordan Carter; Kendrick Duckworth; Jhené Aiko Chilombo; Kanye West; Mark Williams; Rual Cubina; Jarrod Morgan; Keanu Torres	Music	Ojivolta; Kanye West; Scott Bridgeway	2025-03-14	2025	
"Backseat Freestyle" †	Kendrick Duckworth; Chauncey Hollis, Jr.	good kid, m.A.A.d city	Hit-Boy	2012-10-22	2012	
"Barbed Wire" (featuring Ash Riser)	Ash Riser; Kendrick Duckworth; Mark Spears	Overly Dedicated	Sounwave	2010-09-14	2010	
"Best Rapper Under 25"	Kendrick Duckworth	C4	Maestro	2009-01-30	2009	
"Biggie"	Kendrick Duckworth	Y.H.N.I.C. (Hub City Threat: Minor of the Year)	Nashiem Myrick	2003-04-15	2004	
"Big Shot" (with Travis Scott)	Kendrick Duckworth; Mark Spears; Ronald LaTour; Brock Korsan; Kevin Gomringer; Tim Gomringer; Jacques Webster	Black Panther: The Album	Cardo; Cubeatz; Sounwave; Matt Schaeffer	2018-02-09	2018	
"Bitch, Don't Kill My Vibe" †	Kendrick Duckworth; Mark Spears; Robin Braun; Vindahl Friis; Lykke Schmidt	good kid, m.A.A.d city	Sounwave	2012-10-22	2012	
"Bitch, Don't Kill My Vibe (Remix)" (featuring Jay-Z) †	Kendrick Duckworth; Mark Spears; Robin Braun; Vindahl Friis; Lykke Schmidt; Shawn Carter	good kid, m.A.A.d city (Deluxe Edition)	Sounwave	2012-10-22	2013	
"Bitch I'm in the Club"	Kendrick Duckworth	C4	T-Pain; Play-N-Skillz	2009-01-30	2009	
"Black Boy Fly"	Kendrick Duckworth; Columbus Smith; Dawaun Parker	good kid, m.A.A.d city (Deluxe Edition)	Rahki	2012-10-22	2012	
"Black Panther"	Kendrick Duckworth; Mark Spears; Kevin Gomringer; Tim Gomringer; Matt Schaeffer	Black Panther: The Album	Kendrick Lamar; Sounwave; Cubeatz; Matt Schaeffer	2018-02-09	2018	
"The Blacker the Berry" †	Kendrick Duckworth; Matthew Samuels; Stephen Kozmeniuk; Ken Lewis; Brent Kolatalo; Jefferey Campbell; Alexander Izquierdo; Zale Epstein	To Pimp a Butterfly	Boi-1da; KOZ; Terrace Martin	2015-03-15	2015	
"BLOOD."	Kendrick Duckworth; Daniel Tannenbaum; Anthony Tiffith	Damn	Bēkon; Anthony Tiffith	2017-04-14	2017	
"Bloody Waters" (Note: Kendrick Lamar contributes vocals to every track in Black Panther, including those he is not credited on.) (performed by Ab-Soul, Anderson Paak and James Blake)	Kendrick Duckworth; Mark Spears; Robin Braun; Herbert Stevens IV; James Litherland	Black Panther: The Album	Sounwave; Kendrick Lamar; Robin Hannibal	2018-02-09	2018	
"Blow My High (Members Only)"	Kendrick Duckworth; Melissa Elliott; Timothy Mosely	Section.80	Tommy Black	2011-07-02	2011	
"Cartoon and Cereal" (featuring Gunplay)	Kendrick Duckworth; Ricci Riera; Axel Morgan	—N/a	THC	2012-02-14	2012	
"Celebration"	Kendrick Duckworth; Mark Spears; Gene McDaniels; Nat Adderley	Kendrick Lamar	Sounwave	2009-12-31	2009	
"Chapter Six"	Kendrick Duckworth; Fredrik Halldin	Section.80	Tommy Black	2011-07-02	2011	
"Chapter Ten"	Kendrick Duckworth; Ricci Riera; Axel Morgan	Section.80	THC; Iman Omari	2011-07-02	2011	
"Complexion (A Zulu Love)" (featuring Rapsody)	Kendrick Duckworth; Stephen Bruner; Mark Spears; Marlanna Evans	To Pimp a Butterfly	Stephen Bruner; Sounwave; Terrace Martin; The Antydote	2015-03-15	2015	
"Compton" (featuring Dr. Dre)	Kendrick Duckworth; Justin Smith; Charles Richard Cason; Sly Jordan	good kid, m.A.A.d city	Just Blaze	2012-10-22	2012	
"Compton Chemistry"	Kendrick Duckworth	C4	Swizz Beatz	2009-01-30	2009	
"Compton Life"	Kendrick Duckworth	Y.H.N.I.C. (Hub City Threat: Minor of the Year)	Kendrick Lamar	2003-04-15	2004	
"Count Me Out"	Kendrick Duckworth; Sam Dew; Mark Spears; Dacoury Natche; Jason Pounds	Mr. Morale & the Big Steppers	Oklama; Sounwave; DJ Dahi; J. Lbs	2022-05-13	2022	
"Crown"	Kendrick Duckworth; Sam Dew; Duval Timothy	Mr. Morale & the Big Steppers	Duval Timothy	2022-05-13	2022	
"Cut You Off (To Grow Closer)"	Donte Perkins; Kendrick Duckworth	Overly Dedicated	Tae Beast	2010-09-14	2010	
"Determined" (featuring Ash Riser)	Kendrick Duckworth; Ash Riser; Mark Spears	Kendrick Lamar	Sounwave	2009-12-31	2009	
"Die Hard" (with Blxst and Amanda Reifer) †	Kendrick Duckworth; Matthew Burdette; Amanda Reifer; Sam Dew; Stephen Bruner; Victor Ekpo; Mark Spears; Dacoury Natche; Hykeem Carter; Jason Pounds; Michael Mulé; Isaac De Boni; Marvin Eugene Smith; Robert T. "Bob" Smith	Mr. Morale & the Big Steppers	Sounwave; DJ Dahi; Baby Keem; J. Lbs	2022-05-13	2022	
"DNA."	Kendrick Duckworth; Michael Williams II	Damn	Mike Will Made It	2017-04-14	2017	
"Dodger Blue" (featuring Roddy Ricch, Siete7x and Wallie the Sensei)	Kendrick Duckworth; Sam Dew; Traquan Tyson; Chi Siete	GNX	Sounwave; Jack Antonoff; Tim Maxey; Tane Runo; Terrace Martin	2024-11-22	2024	
"Doves in the Wind" (SZA featuring Kendrick Lamar)	Kendrick Duckworth; Solána Rowe; Cameron Osteen; Reggie Noble; John Bowman; Dana Stinson; Trevor Smith; James Yancey	Ctrl	Cam O'bi	2017-06-09	2017	
"Drop It Like It's Hot (Freestyle)" (featuring Dave Free)	Kendrick Duckworth; David Friley	Y.H.N.I.C. (Hub City Threat: Minor of the Year)	The Neptunes	2003-04-15	2004	
"DUCKWORTH."	Kendrick Duckworth; Patrick Douthit	Damn	9th Wonder; Bēkon	2017-04-14	2017	
"ELEMENT."	Kendrick Duckworth; Mark Spears; James Blake; Ricci Riera; Tae Beast; Bēkon	Damn	Sounwave; James Blake; Ricci Riera	2017-04-14	2017	
"Euphoria" †	Kendrick Duckworth	—N/a	Cardo; Kyuro; Johnny Juliano; Sounwave; Young Exclusive	2024-04-30	2024	
"Faith" (featuring BJ the Chicago Kid and Punch)	Kendrick Duckworth; Terrence Henderson, Jr. Bryan Sledge; Brandon Blue	Kendrick Lamar	King Blue	2009-12-31	2009	
"family ties" (with Baby Keem) †	Kendrick Duckworth; Hykeem Carter; Ronald LaTour; Tobias Dekker; Roshwita Bacha; Dominik Patrzek; Jasper Harris; Colin Franken	The Melodic Blue	Baby Keem; Cardo; Outtatown; Roselilah; Deats; Jasper Harris; Frankie Bash	2021-08-27	2021	
"Famous Pipe Game" (featuring Ab-Soul)	Kendrick Duckworth; Herbert Stevens IV	C4	Deezle	2009-01-30	2009	
"Far From Here" (featuring Schoolboy Q)	Kendrick Duckworth; Quincy Hanley; Jacob Dutton	Kendrick Lamar	Jake One	2009-12-31	2009	
"Father Time" (featuring Sampha)	Kendrick Duckworth; Sampha Sisay; Mark Spears; Dacoury Natche; Matt Schaeffer; Johnny Kosich; Jake Kosich; Daniel Tannenbaum; Duval Timothy; Victor Ekpo; Kennis Jones	Mr. Morale & the Big Steppers	Sounwave; DJ Dahi; Beach Noise; Bekon; Duval Timothy; Grandmaster Vic	2022-05-13	2022	
"FEAR."	Kendrick Duckworth; Daniel Maman	Damn	The Alchemist; Bēkon	2017-04-14	2017	
"FEEL."	Kendrick Duckworth; Mark Spears	Damn	Sounwave	2017-04-14	2017	
"For Free? (Interlude)"	Kendrick Duckworth; Terrace Martin; Rose McKinney	To Pimp a Butterfly	Terrace Martin	2015-03-15	2015	
"For Sale? (Interlude)"	Kendrick Duckworth; Taz Arnold	To Pimp a Butterfly	Taz Arnold; Sounwave; Terrace Martin	2015-03-15	2015	
"Friend of Mine"	Kendrick Duckworth	C4	The Neptunes	2009-01-30	2009	
"Fuck Your Ethnicity"	Kendrick Duckworth; Axel Morgan	Section.80	THC		2011	
"G Code"	Kendrick Duckworth	C4	Kanye West; Deezle	2009-01-30	2009	
"Gloria" (with SZA)	Kendrick Duckworth; Solána Rowe; Atia Boggs; Deyra Barrera	GNX	Sounwave; Jack Antonoff; Deats	2024-11-22	2024	
"gnx" (featuring Hitta J3, Peysoh and YoungThreat)	Kendrick Duckworth; Dominicke Williams; Kevin Oropeza; Deonta Simuel	GNX	Sounwave; Jack Antonoff; Rascal; Kenny & Billy; Tim Maxey	2024-11-22	2024	
"Go DJ" (featuring Dave Free)	Kendrick Duckworth	Y.H.N.I.C. (Hub City Threat: Minor of the Year)	Mannie Fresh	2003-04-15	2004	
"GOD."	Kendrick Duckworth; Ricci Riera; Mark Spears; Dacoury Natche; Daniel Tannenbaum; Ronald LaTour; Anthony Tiffith	Damn	Ricci Riera; Sounwave; DJ Dahi; Bēkon; Cardo; Anthony Tiffith	2017-04-14	2017	
"GOOD CREDIT"	Jordan Carter; Kendrick Duckworth	Music	Cardo Got Wings	2025-03-14	2025	
"Good Flirts" (featuring Kendrick Lamar and Momo Boyd)	Hykeem Carter Kendrick Duckworth Kayla Le Cydel Young Teo Halm Tobias Breuer Teddy Danso Sarpong Burt Bacharach Hal David Lonnie Lynn James Yancey Bobby Caldwell Bruce Malament Norman Harris	Ca$ino	Baby Keem Halm Rascal Whatssarp	2026-02-20	2026	
"good kid"	Kendrick Duckworth; Pharrell Williams	good kid, m.A.A.d city	Pharrell Williams	2012-10-22	2012	
"Growing Apart (To Get Closer)" (featuring Jhené Aiko)	Jhené Aiko; Kendrick Duckworth; Donte Perkins	Overly Dedicated	Tae Beast	2010-09-14	2010	
"The Heart Pt. 2" (featuring Dash Snow)	Kendrick Duckworth; Dashiell A. Snow	Overly Dedicated	The Roots	2010-09-14	2010	
"The Heart Part 4" †	Kendrick Duckworth; Joshua Scruggs; Axel Morgan; Dacoury Natche; Daniel Maman; Khalid Robinson	Non-album promotional single	Syk Sense; Axlfolie; DJ Dahi; The Alchemist	2017-03-23	2017	
"The Heart Part 5" †	Kendrick Duckworth; Johnny Kosich; Jake Kosich; Matt Schaeffer; Leon Ware; Arthur Ross	Mr. Morale & the Big Steppers	Beach Noise	2022-05-13	2022	
"heart pt. 6"	Kendrick Duckworth	GNX	Sounwave; Jack Antonoff; M-Tech; Juju	2024-11-22	2024	
"Heaven & Hell" (featuring Alori Joh)	Kendrick Duckworth; Fredrik Halldin	Overly Dedicated	Tommy Black	2010-09-14	2010	
"hey now" (featuring Dody6)	Kendrick Duckworth; Zarius Cunningham	GNX	Mustard; Sounwave; Jack Antonoff	2024-11-22	2024	
"HiiiPoWeR" †	Kendrick Duckworth; Herbert Stevens; Jermaine Cole	Section.80	J. Cole	2011-07-02	2011	
"The Hillbillies" (with Baby Keem) †	Kendrick Duckworth; Hykeem Carter; Diane Chenua; Justin Vernon; Kacy Hill; James Stack; Brandon Burton; Robert Moose; Agnus Fairbairn	—N/a	Evilgiane	2023-05-30	2023	
"H.O.C." (featuring Ab-Soul)	Kendrick Duckworth	Overly Dedicated	Drop	2010-09-14	2010	
"Hol' Up"	Kendrick Duckworth; Mark Spears	Section.80	Sounwave	2011-07-02	2011	
"Hood Politics"	Kendrick Duckworth; Stephen Bruner; Mark Spears; David Friley; Donte Perkins; Sufjan Stevens	To Pimp a Butterfly	Tae Beast; Stephen Bruner; Sounwave	2015-03-15	2015	
"Hovi Baby"	Kendrick Duckworth	Y.H.N.I.C. (Hub City Threat: Minor of the Year)	Just Blaze	2003-04-15	2004	
"How Much a Dollar Cost" (featuring James Fauntleroy and Ronald Isley)	Kendrick Duckworth; Terrace Martin; Josef Leimberg; Rose McKinney; James Fauntleroy; Ronald Isley	To Pimp a Butterfly	LoveDragon	2015-03-15	2015	
"How to Pray" (featuring Kendrick Lamar and Amber Mark)	Kendrick Duckworth	Black Boy (Alternative)		2026-08-28	2026	
"How We Do"	Kendrick Duckworth	Y.H.N.I.C. (Hub City Threat: Minor of the Year)	Dr. Dre; Mike Elizondo	2003-04-15	2004	
"HUMBLE." †	Kendrick Duckworth; Michael Williams II	Damn	Mike Will Made It; Pluss	2017-04-14	2017	
"i" †	Kendrick Duckworth; Columbus Smith; The Isley Brothers (Note: Ronald Isley, O'Kelly Isley Jr., Ernie Isley, Marvin Isley, and Rudolph Isley.); Christopher Jasper	To Pimp a Butterfly	Rahki	2015-03-15	2015	
"I Am" (performed by Jorja Smith)	Kendrick Duckworth; Mark Spears; Jorja Smith; Tobias Breuer; Troy Chester	Black Panther: The Album	Sounwave; Kendrick Lamar	2018-02-09	2018	
"I Am (Interlude)"	Kendrick Duckworth; Kamaal Fareed	Kendrick Lamar	Q-Tip	2009-12-31	2009	
"I Do This" (featuring Jay Rock)	Kendrick Duckworth; Johnny McKinzie; Mark Spears	Kendrick Lamar	Sounwave	2009-12-31	2009	
"I Do This (Remix)" (featuring U-N-I, Skeme and Brown)	Yannick Koffi; Lonnie Kimble; Yonas Semere Michael; Kendrick Duckworth; Mark Spears; Vincent Brown	Overly Dedicated	Sounwave	2010-09-14	2010	
"Ignorance is Bliss"	Kendrick Duckworth; William Brown	Overly Dedicated	Willie B	2010-09-14	2010	
"Industry Niggas (Skit)"	Kendrick Duckworth	Y.H.N.I.C. (Hub City Threat: Minor of the Year)	—N/a	2003-04-15	2004	
"Institutionalized" (featuring Bilal, Anna Wise, and Snoop Dogg)	Kendrick Duckworth; Columbus Smith; Fredrik Halldin; Sam Barsh	To Pimp a Butterfly	Rahki; Tommy Black	2015-03-15	2015	
"Intro"	Kendrick Duckworth; Dwayne Carter, Jr. Johnn McKinzie	C4	Dave Free; DJ III Will	2009-01-30	2009	
"Intro (HOVA Song Freestyle)"	Kendrick Duckworth	Y.H.N.I.C. (Hub City Threat: Minor of the Year)	K-Rob	2003-04-15	2004	
"Is It Love" (featuring Angela McCluskey)	Kendrick Duckworth; Angela McCluskey; Mark Spears	Kendrick Lamar	Sounwave	2009-12-31	2009	
"Keisha's Song (Her Pain)" (featuring Ashtrobot)	Kendrick Duckworth; Donte Perkins	Section.80	Tae Beast	2011-07-02	2011	
"King Kunta" †	Kendrick Duckworth; Stephen Bruner; Johnny Burns; Ahmad Lewis; Stefan Gordy; James Brown; Fred Wesley; John Starks	To Pimp a Butterfly	Sounwave; Terrace Martin	2015-03-15	2015	
"King's Dead" (with Jay Rock, Future and James Blake) †	Kendrick Duckworth; Michael Williams II; Travis Walton; Mark Spears; Johnny McKinzie; Nayvadius Wilburn; James Litherland; Samuel Gloade; Antwon Hicks	Black Panther: The Album	Mike Will Made It; Teddy Walton; Sounwave	2018-02-09	2018	
"Kush & Corinthians" (featuring BJ the Chicago Kid)	Kendrick Duckworth; Wyatt Coleman	Section.80	Wyldfyer	2011-07-02	2011	
"Let Me Be Me"	Kendrick Duckworth; Pete Rahk	Kendrick Lamar	Pete Rahk	2009-12-31	2009	
"Like That" (with Future and Metro Boomin) †	Nayvadius Wilburn; Leland Wayne; Kendrick Duckworth; Rodney Oliver; Joe Cooley; Kobe Hood	We Don't Trust You	Metro Boomin	2024-03-22	2024	
"LOVE." (featuring Zacari) †	Kendrick Duckworth; Zacari Pacaldo; Teddy Walton; Mark Spears; Greg Kurstin; Anthony Tiffith	Damn	DJ Dahi; Sounwave; Greg Kurstin; Anthony Tiffith	2017-04-14	2017	
"LOYALTY." (featuring Rihanna) †	Kendrick Duckworth; Dacoury Natche; Mark Spears; Terrace Martin; Anthony Tiffith	Damn	DJ Dahi; Sounwave; Terrace Martin; Anthony Tiffith	2017-04-14	2017	
"LUST."	Kendrick Duckworth; Dacoury Natche; Mark Spears; BadBadNotGood (Note: Chester Hansen, Alexander Sowinski, Matthew Tavares, and Leland Whitty.)	Damn	DJ Dahi; Sounwave; BadBadNotGood	2017-04-14	2017	
"luther" (with SZA) †	Kendrick Duckworth; Solána Rowe; Atia Boggs; Sam Dew	GNX	Sounwave; Jack Antonoff; Kamasi Washington; Bridgeway; M-Tech; Rose Lilah	2024-11-22	2024	
"m.A.A.d city" (featuring MC Eight)	Kendrick Duckworth; Mark Spears; Ricci Riera; Axel Morgan; Aaron Tyler	good kid, m.A.A.d city	Sounwave; THC; Terrace Martin	2012-10-22	2012	
"man at the garden"	Kendrick Duckworth	GNX	Sounwave; Jack Antonoff; Craig Balmoris; Tyler Mehlenbacher; M-Tech	2024-11-22	2024	
"Meet the Grahams" †	Kendrick Duckworth; Alan Maman	—N/a	The Alchemist	2024-05-03	2024	
"Michael Jordan" (featuring Schoolboy Q)	Quincy Hanley; Kendrick Duckworth; Mark Spears	Overly Dedicated	Sounwave	2010-09-14	2010	
"Mirror"	Kendrick Duckworth; Daniel Krieger; Stuart Johnson; Mark Spears; Dacoury Natche; Daniel Tannenbaum; Tyler Mehlenbacher; Sergiu Gherman; Craig Balmoris	Mr. Morale & the Big Steppers	Sounwave; DJ Dahi; Bekon; The Donuts	2022-05-13	2022	
"Misunderstood" (featuring Jay Rock)	Kendrick Duckworth; Johnny McKinzie	C4	Rodnae; Mousa	2009-01-30	2009	
"Momma"	Kendrick Duckworth; Glen Boothe; Taz Arnold; Sylvester Stewart; Lalah Hathaway; Rahsaan Patterson; Rex Rideout	To Pimp a Butterfly	Knxwledge; Taz Arnold	2015-03-15	2015	
"Money Trees" (featuring Jay Rock)	Kendrick Duckworth; Dacoury Natche; Johnny McKinzie, Jr. Victoria Legrand; Alex Scally	good kid, m.A.A.d city	DJ Dahi	2012-10-22	2012	
"Mortal Man"	Kendrick Duckworth; Stephen Bruner; Fela Anikulapo Kuti; Tupac Shakur	To Pimp a Butterfly	Sounwave	2015-03-15	2015	
"Mother I Sober" (featuring Beth Gibbons)	Kendrick Duckworth; Beth Gibbons; Sam Dew; Stephen Bruner; Mark Spears; Daniel Tannenbaum; Jason Pounds; Timothy Maxey	Mr. Morale & the Big Steppers	Sounwave; Bekon; J. Lbs; Timothy Maxey	2022-05-13	2022	
"Mr. Carter 2 (New Wayne Verse)"	Kendrick Duckworth; Dwayne Carter, Jr.	C4	DJ Infamous; Drew Correa	2009-01-30	2009	
"Mr. Morale" (with Tanna Leone)	Kendrick Duckworth; Avante Santana; Sam Dew; Pharrell Williams	Mr. Morale & the Big Steppers	Pharrell Williams	2022-05-13	2022	
"N95" †	Kendrick Duckworth; Matthew Samuels; Mark Spears; Jahaan Sweet; Hykeem Carter; Sam Dew	Mr. Morale & the Big Steppers	Boi-1da; Sounwave; Jahaan Sweet	2022-05-13	2022	
"Night of the Living Junkies"	Kendrick Duckworth; Mark Spears	Overly Dedicated	Sounwave	2010-09-14	2010	
"No Make-Up (Her Vice)" (featuring Colin Munroe)	Kendrick Duckworth; Mark Spears; Colin Munroe	Section.80	Sounwave	2011-07-02	2011	
"Not Like Us" †	Kendrick Duckworth; Dijon McFarlane; Mark Spears	—N/a	Mustard; Sounwave	2024-05-04	2024	
"Now or Never" (featuring Mary J. Blige)	Kendrick Duckworth; Jack Splash; Jazmine Sullivan	good kid, m.A.A.d city (Deluxe Edition)	Jack Splash	2012-10-22	2012	
"Opposites Attract (Tomorrow, W/O Her)" (featuring JaVonté)	JaVonté Pollard; Kendrick Duckworth; William Brown	Overly Dedicated	Willie B	2010-09-14	2010	
"Opps" (Vince Staples and Yugen Blakrok)	Kendrick Duckworth; Mark Spears; Ludwig Göransson; Vincent Staples	Black Panther: The Album	Sounwave; Ludwig Göransson	2018-02-09	2018	
"P&P" (featuring Ab-Soul)	Kendrick Duckworth; Herbert Stevens IV; Brandon Blue	Kendrick Lamar	King Blue	2009-12-31	2009	
"P&P 1.5" (featuring Ab-Soul)	Herbert Stevens IV; Brandon Blue; Kendrick Duckworth	Overly Dedicated	King Blue	2010-09-14	2010	
"Paramedic" (SOB X RBE)	Kendrick Duckworth; Dacoury Natche; Mark Spears; Kevin Gomringer; Tim Gomringer; Juwon Lee; Graham Harris; Wayman Barrow; Jabbar Brown	Black Panther: The Album	DJ Dahi; Sounwave; Cubeatz	2018-02-09	2018	
"peekaboo" (featuring AZChike)	Kendrick Duckworth; Damaria Walker	GNX	Sounwave; Sean Momberger; Bridgeway	2024-11-22	2024	
"Phone Home" (featuring Punch)	Kendrick Duckworth; Terrence Henderson, Jr.	C4	Cool & Dre	2009-01-30	2009	
"Play With Fire"	Kendrick Duckworth	C4	StreetRunner	2009-01-30	2009	
"Poe Mans Dreams (Her Vice)" (featuring GLC)	Kendrick Duckworth; Greg Lawtie-Campbell; William Brown	Section.80	Willie B	2011-07-02	2011	
"Poetic Justice" (featuring Drake) †	Kendrick Duckworth; Elijah Molina; Aubrey Graham; James Harris; Janet Jackson; Terry Lewis	good kid, m.A.A.d city	Scoop DeVille	2012-10-22	2012	
"Pray for Me" (with The Weeknd) †	Abel Tesfaye; Kendrick Duckworth; Adam Feeney; Martin McKinney	Black Panther: The Album	Frank Dukes; Doc McKinney	2018-02-09	2018	
"PRIDE."	Kendrick Duckworth; Steve Lacy; Anna Wise; Anthony Tiffith	Damn	Steve Lacy; Anthony Tiffith; Bēkon	2017-04-14	2017	
"Purple Hearts" (with Summer Walker and Ghostface Killah)	Kendrick Duckworth; Summer Walker; Dennis Coles; Sam Dew; Anthony Dixson; Mark Spears; Khalil Abdul-Rahman; Jason Pounds; Matt Schaeffer; Johnny Kosich; Jake Kosich	Mr. Morale & the Big Steppers	Sounwave; DJ Khalil	2022-05-13	2022	
"Put That on Somethin'"	Kendrick Duckworth	Y.H.N.I.C. (Hub City Threat: Minor of the Year)	Kendrick Lamar	2003-04-15	2004	
"Range Brothers" (with Baby Keem)	Hykeem Carter; Kendrick Duckworth; Jahaan Sweet; Ruchaun Akers; Dez Wright; Samuel Gloade	—N/a	Baby Keem; 30 Roc; Scott Bridgeway; Dez Wright; Ricky Polo; Jahaan Sweet	2021-09-10	2021	
"Real" (featuring Anna Wise)	Kendrick Duckworth; Terrace Martin	good kid, m.A.A.d city	Terrace Martin	2012-10-22	2012	
"The Recipe" †	Kendrick Duckworth; Andre Young; Elijah Molina; Eric Cardona; Gabe D'Amico; Dev Gupta; Andrea Estella; Bryan Ujueta	good kid, m.A.A.d city (Deluxe edition)	Scoop DeVille	2012-10-22	2012	
"Redemption" (performed by Zacari and Babes Wodumo)	Kendrick Duckworth; Travis Walton; Kurtis McKenzie; Mike Riley; Zacari Pacaldo; Bongekile Simelane; Mandla Maphumulo	Black Panther: The Album	Kurtis McKenzie; Teddy Walton; Scribz Riley; Aaron Bow	2018-02-09	2018	
"Redemption Interlude"	Kendrick Duckworth; Hykeem Carter; Zacari Pacaldo	Black Panther: The Album	Hykeem Carter; Kendrick Lamar	2018-02-09	2018	
"reincarnated"	Kendrick Duckworth; Deyra Barrera	GNX	Kendrick Lamar; Sounwave; Jack Antonoff; M-Tech; Noah Ehler	2024-11-22	2024	
"Rich (Interlude)"	Bill Kapri; Sam Dew; Duval Timothy	Mr. Morale & the Big Steppers	Duval Timothy	2022-05-13	2022	
"Rich Spirit"	Kendrick Duckworth; Sam Dew; Mark Spears; Dacoury Natche; Frano Huett; A. Thomas; D. Dennis; G. Jackson; M. Hall	Mr. Morale & the Big Steppers	Sounwave; DJ Dahi; Frano	2022-05-13	2022	
"Ride Up" (featuring Freeway and Joe Budden)	Joe Budden; Leslie Pridgen; Kendrick Duckworth	Y.H.N.I.C. (Hub City Threat: Minor of the Year)	100 Milez	2003-04-15	2004	
"Rigamortus"	Kendrick Duckworth; Eric Reed	Section.80	Willie B Sounwave	2011-07-02	2011	
"Ronald Reagan Era (His Evils)"	Kendrick Duckworth; Donte Perkins	Section.80	Tae Beast	2011-07-02	2011	
"R.O.T.C. (Interlude)" (featuring BJ the Chicago Kid)	Bryan Sledge; Kendrick Duckworth; Jairus Mozee	Overly Dedicated	J-Mo	2010-09-14	2010	
"Savior" (with Baby Keem and Sam Dew)	Kendrick Duckworth; Sam Dew; Daniel Tannenbaum; Mark Spears; Ronald LaTour; Jason Pounds; Mario Luciano; Tobias Breuer; Tommy Paxton-Beesley	Mr. Morale & the Big Steppers	Cardo; J. Lbs; Sounwave; Oklama	2022-05-13	2022	
"Savior (Interlude)"	Kendrick Duckworth; Hykeem Carter; Mark Spears; Jason Pounds	Mr. Morale & the Big Steppers	Oklama; Sounwave; J. Lbs	2022-05-13	2022	
"Seasons" (performed by Mozzy, Sjava and Reason)	Kendrick Duckworth; Mark Spears; Adam Feeney; Timothy Patterson; Jabulani Hadebe; Robert Gill	Black Panther: The Album	Sounwave; Kendrick Lamar; Frank Dukes	2018-02-09	2018	
"She Needs Me" (featuring JaVonté)	Kendrick Duckworth; JaVonté Pollard; Mark Spears; Dimitri Grimm	Kendrick Lamar	Sounwave	2009-12-31	2009	
"She Needs Me (Remix)" (featuring Dom Kennedy and Murs)	Nicholas Carter; Dominic Hunn; Javonté Pollard; Kendrick Duckworth; Mark Spears	Overly Dedicated	Sounwave	2010-09-14	2010	
"Sherane a.k.a. Master Splinter's Daughter"	Kendrick Duckworth; Christopher Whitacre; Justin Henderson	good kid, m.A.A.d city	Tha Bizness	2012-10-22	2012	
"Shot Down" (featuring Punch)	Kendrick Duckworth; Terrence Henderson, Jr.	C4	D. Smith	2009-01-30	2009	
"Silent Hill" (with Kodak Black) †	Kendrick Duckworth; Bill Kapri; Matthew Samuels; Mark Spears; Jahaan Sweet; Matt Schaeffer; Johnny Kosich; Jake Kosich	Mr. Morale & the Big Steppers	Sounwave; DJ Dahi; Baby Keem; J. Lbs	2022-05-13	2022	
"Sing About Me, I'm Dying of Thirst"	Kendrick Duckworth; Gabe Stevenson; Derrick Hutchins; Quincy Jones; Alan Bergman; Marilyn Bergman	good kid, m.A.A.d city	Like; Skhye Hutch; Sounwave	2012-10-22	2012	
"The Spiteful Chant" (featuring Schoolboy Q)	Kendrick Duckworth; Quincy Hanley; Mark Spears	Section.80	Sounwave; Dave Free	2011-07-02	2011	
"squabble up" †	Kendrick Duckworth	GNX	Kendrick Lamar; Sounwave; Jack Antonoff; Bridgeway; M-Tech	2024-11-22	2024	
"Still Hustlin" (featuring Ab-Soul and Jay Rock)	Kendrick Duckworth	C4	David Banner	2009-01-30	2009	
"Swimming Pools (Drank)" †	Kendrick Duckworth; Tyler Williams	good kid, m.A.A.d city	T-Minus	2012-10-22	2012	
"Take Off Your Pants" (performed by Ab-Soul)	Herbert Stevens IV	C4	Robin Thicke	2009-01-30	2009	
"Tammy's Song (Her Evils)"	Kendrick Duckworth; Ricci Riera; Axel Morgan	Section.80	THC	2011-07-02	2011	
"Thanksgiving" (featuring Big Pooh)	Kendrick Duckworth; Thomas Jones III; Wyatt Coleman	Kendrick Lamar	Wyldfyer	2009-12-31	2009	
"These Walls" †	Kendrick Duckworth; Terrace Martin; Larrance Dopson; James Fauntleroy; Rose McKinney	To Pimp a Butterfly	Terrace Martin; 1500 or Nothin'; Sounwave	2015-03-15	2015	
"Trip"	Kendrick Duckworth; Mark Spears	Kendrick Lamar	Sounwave	2009-12-31	2009	
"tv off" (featuring Lefty Gunplay) †	Kendrick Duckworth	GNX	Mustard; Sounwave; Jack Antonoff; Sean Momberger; Kamasi Washington	2024-11-22	2024	
"u"	Kendrick Duckworth; Taz Arnold; Michael Brown	To Pimp a Butterfly	Taz Arnold; Whoarei; Sounwave	2015-03-15	2015	
"Uncle Bobby & Jason Keaton" (featuring JaVonté)	Kendrick Duckworth; JaVonté Pollard	Kendrick Lamar	Insomnia	2009-12-31	2009	
"United in Grief"	Kendrick Duckworth; Sam Dew; Mark Spears; Jason Pounds; Duval Timothy; Matt Schaeffer; Johnny Kosich; Jake Kosich; Timothy Maxey	Mr. Morale & the Big Steppers	Oklama; Sounwave; J. Lbs; Duval Timothy	2022-05-13	2018	
"untitled 01 | 08.12.2014."	Kendrick Duckworth; Brent Reynolds	untitled unmastered.	Ritz Reynolds	2016-03-04	2016	
"untitled 02 | 06.23.2014."	Kendrick Duckworth; Ronald LaTour; Dave Jackson; Stephen Bruner	untitled unmastered.	Cardo; Yung Exclusive; Stephen Bruner	2016-03-04	2016	
"untitled 03 | 05.28.2013."	Kendrick Duckworth; Mathieu Rakotozafy	untitled unmastered.	Astronote	2016-03-04	2016	
"untitled 04 | 08.14.2014."	Kendrick Duckworth; Stephen Bruner; Mark Spears	untitled unmastered.	Stephen Bruner; Sounwave; Kendrick Lamar	2016-03-04	2016	
"untitled 05 | 09.21.2014."	Kendrick Duckworth; Mark Spears; Terrace Martin; Johnny McKinzie Jr.	untitled unmastered.	Sounwave; Terrace Martin	2016-03-04	2016	
"untitled 06 | 06.30.2014."	Kendrick Duckworth; Adrian Younge; Ali Shaheed Muhammad	untitled unmastered.	Adrian Younge; Ali Shaheed Muhammad	2016-03-04	2016	
"untitled 07 | 2014–2016" †	Kendrick Duckworth; Ronald LaTour; Stephen Bruner; Daveon Jackson; Adam Feeney; Kasseem Dean; Egypt Daoud Dean; Taz Arnold	untitled unmastered.	Cardo; Yung Exclusive; Frank Dukes; Swizz Beatz; Egypt	2016-03-04	2016	
"untitled 08 | 09.06.2014."	Kendrick Duckworth; Stephen Bruner; Charles Dickerson	untitled unmastered.	Stephen Bruner; Mono/Poly	2016-03-04	2016	
"Vanity Slaves"	Kendrick Duckworth; Phonte Coleman; Matthijs Rook	Kendrick Lamar	The Foreign Exchange	2009-12-31	2009	
"Vanity Slaves, Pt. 2" (featuring Gucci Mane)	Kendrick Duckworth; Mark Spears; Radric Davis	—N/a	Sounwave	2011-01-24	2011	
"wacced out murals"	Kendrick Duckworth; Deyra Barrera	GNX	Sounwave; Jack Antonoff; Dahi; Craig Balmoris; Frano; Tyler Mehlenbacher; M-Tech	2024-11-22	2024	
"Wanna Be Heard"	Kendrick Duckworth; Curtis Cross	Kendrick Lamar	Black Milk	2009-12-31	2009	
"Watch the Party Die"	Kendrick Duckworth	—N/a	Jack Antonoff; Pasqué; Greg Sekeres	2024-09-11	2024	
"The Ways" (performed by Khalid featuring Swae Lee)	Kendrick Duckworth; Mark Spears; BadBadNotGood (Note: Chester Hansen, Alexander Sowinski, Matthew Tavares, and Leland Whitty.); Khalid Robinson; Khalif Brown	Black Panther: The Album	Sounwave; BadBadNotGood; Kendrick Lamar	2018-02-09	2018	
"We Cry Together" (with Taylour Paige)	Kendrick Duckworth; Daniel Maman; Jason Pounds; Daniel Tannenbaum; Florence Welch; Gary Peacock	Mr. Morale & the Big Steppers	The Alchemist	2022-05-13	2022	
"Welcome to C4" (featuring Ab-Soul, Jay Rock, Schoolboy Q and BO)	Kendrick Duckworth; Herbert Stevens IV; Johnny McKinzie; Quincy Hanley; BO	C4	The Alchemist	2009-01-30	2009	
"Wesley's Theory"	Kendrick Duckworth; George Clinton; Steven Ellison; Ronald Colson; Stephen Bruner; Boris Gardiner	To Pimp a Butterfly	Flying Lotus; Flippa; Sounwave; Thundercat	2015-03-15	2015	
"West Coast Wu Tang" (featuring Ab-Soul and Punch)	Kendrick Duckworth; Terrence Henderson, Jr. Herbert Stevens IV	C4	RZA	2009-01-30	2009	
"What the Deal"	Kendrick Duckworth	Y.H.N.I.C. (Hub City Threat: Minor of the Year)	Scram Jones	2003-04-15	2004	
"Worldwide Steppers"	Kendrick Duckworth; Sam Dew; Mark Spears; Donte Perkins; Jason Pounds; Vincent Crane; Pat Darnell; Phillip Hunt	Mr. Morale & the Big Steppers	Sounwave; Tae Beast	2022-05-13	2018	
"X" (performed by Schoolboy Q, 2 Chainz and Saudi)	Kendrick Duckworth; Mark Spears; Ramon Ibanga; Quincy Hanley; Tauheed Epps; Anele Mbisha	Black Panther: The Album	Sounwave; Illmind	2018-02-09	2018	
"XXX." (featuring U2)	Kendrick Duckworth; Michael Williams II; Dacoury Natche; Mark Spears; Anthony Tiffith; U2 (Note: Bono, The Edge, Adam Clayton, and Larry Mullen Jr.)	Damn	Mike Will Made It; DJ Dahi; Sounwave; Anthony Tiffith; Bēkon	2017-04-14	2017	
"YAH."	Kendrick Duckworth; Mark Spears; Dacoury Natche; Anthony Tiffith	Damn	Sounwave; DJ Dahi; Anthony Tiffith; Bēkon	2017-04-14	2017	
"You Ain't Gotta Lie (Momma Said)"	Kendrick Duckworth; Terrace Martin; Rose McKinney; Josef Leimberg; Mark Spears	To Pimp a Butterfly	LoveDragon	2015-03-15	2015	
"Young & Black"	Kendrick Duckworth	C4	Sounwave	2009-01-30	2009	

== See also ==
- Kendrick Lamar discography
