= Meeting with a Judas Tree =

Studio album by Duval Timothy
- Released: 11 November 2022
- Recorded: 2019–2022
- Length: 32:15
- Label: Carrying Colour
- Producer: Duval Timothy

Duval Timothy chronology
Help (2020)	Meeting with a Judas Tree (2022)	Wishful Thinking (2025)

Meeting with a Judas Tree is a studio album by English record producer Duval Timothy. It was released on 11 November 2022, through Carrying Colour. It peaked at number 90 on the UK Album Downloads Chart.

== Background ==
Meeting with a Judas Tree was recorded between 2019 and 2022. It features contributions from Yu Su, Fauzia, and Lamin Fofana. It is Duval Timothy's first solo studio album since Help (2020). In between, he released Son (2021), a collaborative project with Rosie Lowe.

== Critical reception ==
Professional ratings
Review scores
Source	Rating
Beats Per Minute	80%
The Guardian	4/5 stars
Pitchfork	8.0/10
Under the Radar	7.5/10

Michelle Dalarossa of Under the Radar described the album as "a swirling montage of structured composition and ambient electronica, a free-formed and dynamic rendering of emotional vitality that calls for close listening." She added, "Timothy's work is loaded with emotion and expressiveness, and those that commit to intentional listening will be rewarded with a piece of music that is intelligent and soulful, even at only six tracks long." Philip Sherburne of Pitchfork stated, "Whether working solo or in collaboration, seated at a Steinway or with his Zoom recorder pressed up against a tree, Timothy's musical voice remains as singular as ever."

James Gui of The Quietus commented that "Meeting with a Judas Tree takes the musical directions he explored on Help and condenses them into just over thirty minutes, a distillation of Duval Timothy's wildly diverse artistic practice into a project at once small and capacious." John Morrison of Bandcamp Daily stated, "Meeting with a Judas Tree is not only a collection of beautiful sounds, it's a document of the joy, wonder, and impermanence of life."

John Lewis of The Guardian stated, "Timothy's brand of minimalism is simple but hugely satisfying: this disruptive approach introduces a new layer of mystery and randomness to already beautiful music." He placed the album at number 3 on his list of the "10 Best Contemporary Albums of 2022". Sheldon Pearce of NPR included the album in his list of the "Top 20 Albums of 2022".

=== Accolades ===
Year-end lists for Meeting with a Judas Tree
Publication	List	Rank	Ref.
DJ Mag	DJ Mag's Top Albums of 2022	—	

== Track listing ==
All tracks are written by Duval Timothy, except "Wood" co-written with Yu Su and "Thunder" co-written with Fauzia.

Meeting with a Judas Tree track listing
No.	Title	Length
1.	"Plunge"	2:48
2.	"Wood" (featuring Yu Su)	3:32
3.	"Mutate"	8:39
4.	"Up"	3:50
5.	"Thunder" (featuring Fauzia)	7:33
6.	"Drift" (featuring Lamin Fofana)	5:50
Total length:		32:15

== Personnel ==
Credits adapted from liner notes.

- Duval Timothy – production
- Yu Su – additional piano (2), additional synthesizer (2)
- Kiran Kai – additional guitar (2)
- Vegyn – additional production (4)
- Erica Timothy – voice field recording (4)
- Fauzia – live effects (5)
- Lamin Fofana – additional production (6)
- Philip Weinrobe – mixing
- Brian Bender – mixing for Dolby Atmos
- Josh Bonati – mastering

== Charts ==
Chart performance for Meeting with a Judas Tree
Chart (2022)	Peak position
UK Album Downloads (OCC)	90
