= Kendrick Lamar discography =

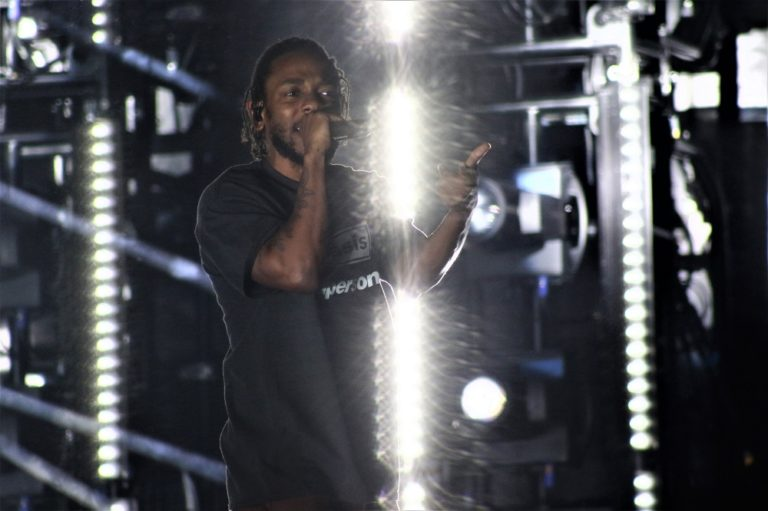
Kendrick Lamar performing at Grandoozy on September 14, 2018 in Denver, Colorado.

Kendrick Lamar discography may refer to:

- Kendrick Lamar albums discography
- Kendrick Lamar singles discography
- List of songs recorded by Kendrick Lamar
