= Training Day (disambiguation) =

Training Day is a 2001 American crime thriller film.

Training Day may also refer to:

- Training Day (soundtrack), soundtrack of the film above
- Training Day (TV series), CBS TV series based on the 2001 film
- "Training Day" (Archer), a 2010 television episode
- "Training Day" (Arrow), a 2019 television episode
- "Training Day" (Human Resources), a 2022 television episode
- "Training Day" (The Loud House), a segment from a 2021 television episode
- "Training Day" (Odd Squad), a 2015 television episode
- "Training Day" (The Office), a 2011 television episode
- "Training Day" (The Rookie), a 2024 television episode
- Training Day (album), 2007 album, the second by hip hop duo The Away Team
- Training Day (Potter Payper album), 2013 album, first of the Training Day album trilogy by Potter Payper
- Training Day (mixtape), a 2007 mixtape by Kendrick Lamar

== See also ==
- Teacher training day
