= When I Get Home (album) =

Studio album by Solange
- Released: March 1, 2019
- Genres: R&B; jazz; psychedelic soul; funk; hip-hop; new-age-trap; ambient
- Length: 39:01
- Label: Columbia
- Producers: Solange Knowles (also exec.); Chassol; Daniel Julez J Smith II; Dev Hynes; Duval Timothy; Earl Sweatshirt; Jamire Williams; John Carroll Kirby; John Key; Metro Boomin; Panda Bear; Pharrell Williams; Standing on the Corner; Steve Lacy; Tyler, the Creator

Solange chronology
A Seat at the Table (2016)	When I Get Home (2019)

When I Get Home is the fourth studio album by American singer and songwriter Solange, released on March 1, 2019. It is the follow-up to her 2016 album A Seat at the Table and explores Solange's hometown of Houston, Texas.

Solange produced the album alongside a variety of collaborators, including John Key, John Carroll Kirby, Standing on the Corner, Chassol, Jamire Williams, and Pharrell Williams. The album also features contributions from several high-profile musicians, including Sampha, Playboi Carti, Gucci Mane, Panda Bear, Tyler, the Creator, Metro Boomin, The-Dream, Abra, Dev Hynes, Steve Lacy, Earl Sweatshirt, and Scarface.

== Background and promotion ==
Solange began working on the album in a rented house in her hometown of Houston, after completing a tour in support of her previous album A Seat at the Table. In an October 2018 interview with T: The New York Times Style Magazine, she revealed that a forthcoming album, recorded between New Orleans, Houston, the Topanga Canyon and Jamaica, was near completion. She said of its sound: "There is a lot of jazz at the core... But with electronic and hip-hop drum and bass because I want it to bang and make your trunk rattle."

On February 27, 2019, Solange released a teaser video on social media, and shared the album's track listing on February 28. The video references the Houston rapper Mike Jones and his well-known cell phone number. She also set up a page on BlackPlanet, a social networking website aimed at African Americans, and shared teaser images for the album on the site.

== Composition ==
The album blends "cosmic" jazz, hip-hop, and R&B, and has also been described as psychedelic soul, "new-age trap", and a "drowsy funk throwdown". It is also influenced by chopped and screwed hip-hop originating from Solange's hometown of Houston, as well as drum and bass. The album has been described as an ode to Houston's hip-hop scene, and is narrated by a range of sampled African-American women from its Third Ward, where Solange grew up. In writing the album, Solange was inspired by the use of repetition in Stevie Wonder's The Secret Life of Plants as well as music by Steve Reich, Alice Coltrane, and Sun Ra. She also noted that the album was more focused on what she had to "feel", compared to A Seat at the Table's focus on what she had to "say".

== Critical reception ==
Professional ratings
Aggregate scores
Source	Rating
AnyDecentMusic?	8.1/10
Metacritic	89/100
Review scores
Source	Rating
AllMusic	4/5 stars
Chicago Tribune	3/4 stars
Entertainment Weekly	A
The Guardian	3/5 stars
The Independent	4/5 stars
Mojo	4/5 stars
NME	5/5 stars
Pitchfork	8.4/10
Rolling Stone	4/5 stars
Uncut	9/10

At Metacritic, which assigns a normalized rating out of 100 to reviews from mainstream critics, When I Get Home received an average score of 89, based on 25 reviews, indicating "universal acclaim".

Reviewing the album for AllMusic, Andy Kellman claimed that "From the early moment where Solange makes like a group of harmonizing, sunlit Janet Jacksons, it sounds custom made for a basking joy ride that tops out around 20 m.p.h. and slows just enough to accommodate get-ons and drop-offs for a variable group of companions including a lover. It comes across as both spontaneous and deliberate." Malvika Padin also praised the album in the review for Clash, declaring that "The album is driven by an assured sense of direction, always aware of where it's going, never losing itself even as it experiments." In the review for Consequence of Sound, David Sackllah concluded, "Solange's latest mystifies and stuns, leaving you awestruck as she cements her legacy as a true generational voice."

Israel Daramola at Spin wrote that the album "is expertly crafted, curated, and aesthetically dazzling; choreographed, extremely self-serious and self-absorbed; intellectualized, sonically adventurous, but often feels too rehearsed and neat." Kuba Shand-Baptiste at The Independent stated that it "give[s] voice to the endless frustration of being black in the world, to be punished on that basis, and to support the urge we all often feel to push back against it all". She added that "there are melodies slow enough to sink you into a state of tranquility, and beats hard and strong enough to push you to sway and dance while that happens".

Jem Aswad at Variety wrote that "When I Get Home is a challenging and satisfying follow-up to A Seat at the Table, one that will probably baffle some fans but intrigue and engage even more". Jon Pareles at The New York Times observed, "The black solidarity that was Solange's strongest message on A Seat at the Table is still there in 'Stay Flo' and in 'Almeda', where she praises 'Black skin, black braids, black waves, black days' and insists, 'These are black-owned things' over rattlesnake drum-machine accents. But most of the album has her musing on more private, domestic matters and looking inward".

The Observer's Kate Mossman wrote that "Solange has made a record that sounds at times like a collection of demos – fleeting impressions of fluid, contemporary soul songs that fizzle out the moment they're laid down, like a Snapchat album. It's in keeping with the increasingly avant-garde nature of R&B production today, which can be heard in everyone from Frank Ocean to Ariana Grande: songs feel like sketches; hooks and choruses matter less; and music is conceived, perhaps, with visuals in mind – in the manner of Beyoncé's Lemonade. This kind of music demands a lot of the listener – short songs are harder on the attention span than long ones. It's as though Solange is saying: here is a mood, and here is another… but perhaps, with our increasingly insular listening habits, a 'mood' is exactly what we want our music to be."

In a year-end essay for Slate, Ann Powers cited When I Get Home as proof that the format is not dead but rather undergoing a "metamorphosis", with artists such as Solange utilizing the concept album through the culturally-relevant autobiographical narratives. The album was placed in many year-end lists, and it was ranked 81st on Pitchfork's 2010s decade-end list.

Select year-end lists for When I Get Home
Publication	Accolade	Rank	Ref.
The A.V. Club	The 20 Best Albums of 2019	6	
Billboard	The 50 Best Albums of 2019	27	
Clash	Albums of the Year 2019	14	
Consequence of Sound	Top 50 Albums of 2019	18	
The Guardian	The 50 Best Albums of 2019	19	
NME	The 50 Best Albums of 2019	14	
Paste	The 34 Best Albums of 2019	25	
Pitchfork	The 50 Best Albums of 2019	5	
Time	The 10 Best Albums of 2019	2	
Vice	The 100 Best Albums of 2019	19	

== Film ==
Directed and edited by Solange, the creative vision behind the 33-minute film was inspired in part by the devastation of Hurricane Harvey in Houston. Music video director Alan Ferguson, filmmaker Terence Nance, visual artist Jacolby Satterwhite, and video director Ray Tintori contributed to the editing process with additional credit given to Autumn Knight and Robert Pruitt, according to Pitchfork.

"The film is an exploration of origin, asking the question how much of ourselves do we bring with us versus leave behind in our evolution," Solange's representatives said in a statement. "The artist returned to Third Ward Houston to answer this."

The film accompanies all seventeen tracks in one continuous narrative or visual album with various aspects dedicated to Houston's history including its hip-hop scene, for instance, the chopped and screwed remix style and mixtapes of DJ Screw. The 17th track "Sound of Rain" is accompanied by a surreal, game-world animation akin to Second Life that features original artwork by Satterwhite.

Solange premiered the film in nine local venues for members of the Black Houston community including "her mother's old hair salon; Unity National Bank, the only black owned Texas banking institution; and Emancipation Gym, the only public park open to African Americans in the Jim Crow era."

The film was released alongside the album through Apple Music on March 1, 2019. The 41-minute director's cut of the film was released on all platforms on December 12, 2019. The director's cut features new sequences, as well as a previously unreleased track titled "Dreams (Demo 2)". A limited edition DVD of the director's cut was sold on the album's one-year anniversary, among other merchandise items, through her BlackPlanet page. On the album's second anniversary, the remastered film began streaming through the Criterion Channel.

== Commercial performance ==
When I Get Home debuted at number seven on the US Billboard 200 with 43,000 album-equivalent units (of which 11,000 were pure album sales). It is Solange's third US top 10 album.

== Track listing ==
When I Get Home
No.	Title	Writer(s)	Producer(s)	Length
1.	"Things I Imagined"	Solange	Solange; John Key; Christophe Chassol	1:59
2.	"S McGregor" (interlude)	Solange; Key; Giovanni Cortez	Solange; Key; Standing on the Corner	0:16
3.	"Down with the Clique"	Solange	Solange; Key; John Carroll Kirby; Standing on the Corner^{[a]}	3:42
4.	"Way to the Show"	Solange	Solange; Key; Kirby	2:55
5.	"Can I Hold the Mic" (interlude)	Solange; Chassol	Solange; Chassol	0:22
6.	"Stay Flo"	Solange	Solange; Kirby; Metro Boomin	2:56
7.	"Dreams"	Solange; Duval Kojo Bankole Timothy	Solange; Key; Chassol; Jamire Williams; Dev Hynes; Earl Sweatshirt^{[a]}	2:28
8.	"Nothing Without Intention" (interlude)	Solange; Julez Smith II; Cortez; Amber Venerable; Raquel Egbuonu	Solange; Smith; Standing on the Corner	0:24
9.	"Almeda"	Solange; Terius Nash; Jordan Carter	Solange; Kirby; Pharrell	3:56
10.	"Time (Is)"	Solange; Sampha Sisay	Solange; Key; Kirby	3:40
11.	"My Skin My Logo"	Solange; Radric Davis	Solange; Key; Kirby; Davis; Williams; Tyler, the Creator; Steve Lacy	2:56
12.	"We Deal with the Freak'n" (intermission)	Solange; Sidney Barnes; Greg Perry	Solange	0:32
13.	"Jerrod"	Solange	Solange; Key; Kirby	3:02
14.	"Binz"	Solange; Key; Nash; Noah Lennox	Solange; Key; Panda Bear	1:51
15.	"Beltway"	Solange; Charles Simmons, Jr.	Solange; Kirby	1:41
16.	"Exit Scott" (interlude)	Solange; Key; Lacy; Simmons; Cortez	Solange; Key; Lacy; Standing on the Corner	1:01
17.	"Sound of Rain"	Solange	Solange; Key; Pharrell	3:06
18.	"Not Screwed!" (interlude)	Solange; Cortez; Brad Jordan	Standing on the Corner	0:22
19.	"I'm a Witness"	Solange	Solange; Key	1:52
Total length:				39:01

Notes

- ^{^[a]} – outro only
- "Almeda" features guest appearances by Playboi Carti and The-Dream
- "Time (Is)" features a guest appearance by Sampha
- "My Skin My Logo" features a guest appearance by Gucci Mane
- "Not Screwed" features a guest appearance by Standing on the Corner

Samples

- "S McGregor" (interlude)
  - contains a sample from "Superstars & Their Moms" used courtesy of Debbie Allen, Dick Clark Productions and Phylicia Rashad.
- "Can I Hold the Mic" (interlude)
  - contains a sample from "BTS Crime Mob Footage" (aka "Diamond and Princess of Crime Mob Uncut!") used courtesy of Diamond and Princess.
- "Dreams"
  - contains a sample from "No" as written and performed by Duval Timothy; used courtesy of Carrying Colour.
- "Nothing Without Intention" (interlude)
  - contains a sample from "Florida Water for Cleansing and Clearing" used courtesy of Goddess Lula Belle.
- "We Deal with the Freak'n" (intermission)
  - contains samples from "Turn Me On" as performed by Rotary Connection, written by Sidney Barnes and Greg Perry; used courtesy of Universal Music Enterprises.
  - contains samples from "Sperm Power 2" used courtesy of Alexyss K. Tylor.
- "Binz"
  - contains samples from "Didn't Want to Have to Do It" as performed by Rotary Connection, written by John Sebastian; used courtesy of Universal Music Enterprises.
  - contains samples of "Vagina Power: Halloween Show" used courtesy of Alexyss K. Tylor.
- "Beltway"
  - contains a portion of the composition "I Hope You Really Love Me" written by Charles Simmons, Jr.
- "Exit Scott" (interlude)
  - contains a sample from "Poem to Ann #2" as written and performed by Pat Parker; used courtesy of Sinister Wisdom and The Olivia Companies.
  - contains a sample from "Where Would I Be Without You" courtesy of Anastasia Dunham-Parker-Brady, Sinister Wisdom and Olivia Records.
  - contains a sample of the recording "I Hope You Really Love Me" performed by Family Circle, written by Charles Simmons, Jr; used courtesy of The Numero Group.

== Personnel ==
Musicians

- Solange Knowles – performance
- Tyler, the Creator – additional vocals (tracks 3, 10, and 11), additional keyboards (tracks 3)
- Cassie – additional vocals (track 4)
- John Key – additional keyboards (track 5)
- Peter Lee Johnson – bass (track 6)
- Devin the Dude – additional vocals (track 7)
- Raphael Saadiq – additional bass (track 7)
- John Carroll Kirby – Moog (track 7)
- Metro Boomin – additional vocals (tracks 6 and 9)
- Panda Bear – additional vocals (tracks 10, 15, and 19)
- Sampha – additional vocals (track 10)
- The-Dream – additional vocals (track 14)
- Scarface – vocals (track 16), additional vocals (track 18)
- Abra – additional vocals (track 17)
- Steve Lacy – additional vocals (track 16)

Technical

- Mikaelin "Blue" Bluespruce – mixing
- Joe LaPorta – mastering

== Charts ==
Chart (2019)	Peak position
Australian Albums (ARIA)	17
Belgian Albums (Ultratop Flanders)	18
Belgian Albums (Ultratop Wallonia)	165
Canadian Albums (Billboard)	16
Danish Albums (Hitlisten)	21
Dutch Albums (Album Top 100)	19
French Albums (SNEP)	84
Irish Albums (IRMA)	44
Lithuanian Albums (AGATA)	26
New Zealand Albums (RMNZ)	26
Swedish Albums (Sverigetopplistan)	46
Swiss Albums (Schweizer Hitparade)	27
UK Albums (Official Charts)	18
US Billboard 200	7
US Top R&B/Hip-Hop Albums (Billboard)	3
