= Ghosts (Ash Riser album) =

Studio album by Ash Riser
- Released: July 7, 2017
- Genre: Alternative hip hop
- Length: 55:21
- Label: Self-released
- Producer: Ash Riser (also exec.); Greg Ogan; Jawa; Left Brain; Spencer Nezi; Tae Beast; Xay Scott

Ash Riser chronology
R.I.S.E. (2016)	Ghosts (2017)

Singles from Ghosts
- 1. "Lord Don't Fail Me Now" Released: May 19, 2017; 2. "Moon Cry" Released: June 9, 2017

Ghosts is the debut studio album by American musician Ash Riser, and the only released during his lifetime. It was self-released on July 7, 2017. The album was supported by two singles, "Lord Don't Fail Me Now" featuring Left Brain and "Moon Cry" featuring Papo and Mike G.

== Track listing ==
- All tracks are written and produced by Ash Riser, except where noted.

No.	Title	Writer(s)	Producer(s)	Length
1.	"Don't Look" (featuring Quentin Miller)	Riser; Quentin Miller		2:27
2.	"Hell's Waiting Room"			3:36
3.	"Moon Cry" (featuring Papo and Mike G)	Riser; Michael Griffin II	Jawa	4:30
4.	"Skit 1"			0:19
5.	"Ghosts"			3:10
6.	"Other Day / Mr. U" (featuring Love Mansuy)	Riser; Love Mansuy		7:43
7.	"Selfish" (featuring Noel Bonham)	Riser; Noel Bonham	Left Brain; Riser	3:24
8.	"Skit 2"			0:18
9.	"Lord Don't Fail Me Now" (featuring Left Brain)	Riser; Vyron Turner	Tae Beast	4:00
10.	"Too Cool" (featuring Overdoz)	Riser; Khalil Muhammad	Left Brain	3:38
11.	"Déjà Vu"			3:24
12.	"Take Me to Your Leader"		Xay Scott; Riser	3:14
13.	"Can't Breath"		Greg Ogan; Spencer Nezi; Riser	3:49
14.	"Skit 3"			0:19
15.	"Money Change Everything"			3:49
16.	"Turn the Channel"			3:12
17.	"Record and Drugs"			4:20
Total length:				55:21
