= Kendrick Lamar albums discography =

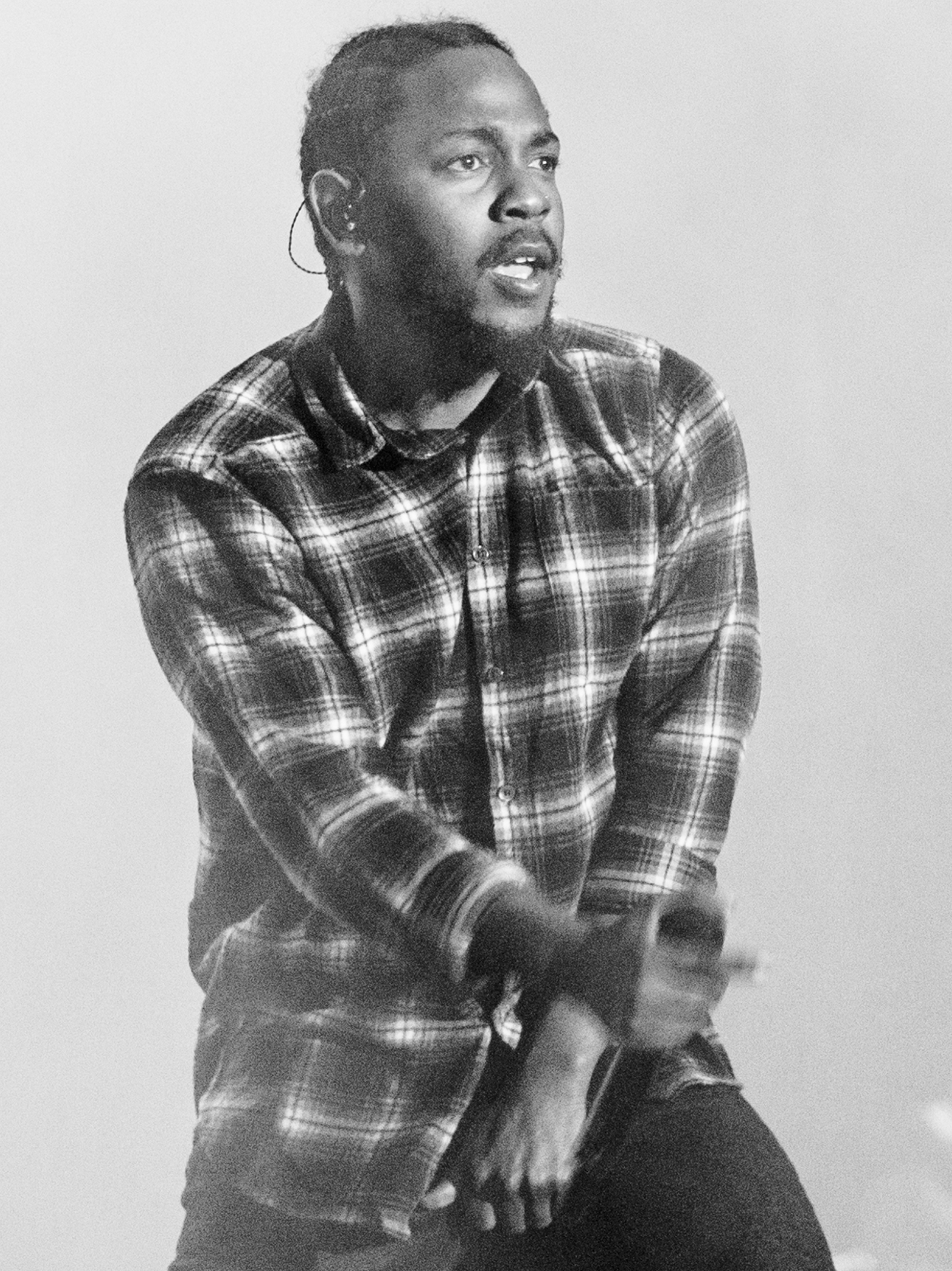
- Lamar performing in 2016
- Studio albums: 6
- EPs: 1
- Soundtrack albums: 1
- Compilation albums: 1
- Mixtapes: 5

American rapper Kendrick Lamar has released six studio albums, one compilation album, one extended play (EP), one soundtrack album, and five mixtapes. He had sold more than 17.9 million album-equivalent units worldwide as of June 2018. In the United States, he has earned five number-one albums on the Billboard 200 chart and achieved 7.5 million certified album units by the Recording Industry Association of America (RIAA). Lamar began his recording career under the stage name K.Dot. His first mixtape, Youngest Head Nigga in Charge (Hub City Threat: Minor of the Year), was released, while he was in high school. He signed a recording contract with Top Dawg Entertainment in 2005, and his subsequent mixtapes were Training Day (2007), No Sleep 'Til NYC (with Jay Rock; 2007), and C4 (2009). After retiring his stage name with Kendrick Lamar (2009), he scored his first entry on the Billboard charts with his fifth mixtape, Overly Dedicated (2010), which reached number 72 on the Top R&B/Hip-Hop Albums chart.

Lamar's first studio album, Section.80 (2011), peaked at number 113 on the Billboard 200. He achieved popularity with his second studio album, Good Kid, M.A.A.D City (2012), which was released under a joint recording contract with Aftermath Entertainment and Interscope Records. Good Kid, M.A.A.D City has spent more weeks on the Billboard 200 chart than any hip-hop studio album in history, having tallied 550 weeks by May 2023. His third studio album, To Pimp a Butterfly (2015), marked his first number-one album on the Billboard 200 and on charts in Australia, Canada, New Zealand, and the United Kingdom. His compilation album, Untitled Unmastered (2016), topped the Billboard 200.

Lamar's fourth studio album, Damn (2017), was the Billboard year-end number-one album of 2017 and the seventh-best-selling album worldwide of the year. He curated and executive-produced Black Panther: The Album (2018), which broke the record for the most streams in a single week for a soundtrack album. His fifth studio album, Mr. Morale & the Big Steppers (2022), marked the conclusion of his tenure with TDE and Aftermath. A chart-topper in over ten countries, it was the first hip hop album of 2022 to accumulate over one billion streams on Spotify. He surprise-released his sixth studio album, GNX (2024), at the tail-end of his then ongoing feud with Canadian rapper Drake. The album yielded two additional number one hits on the Billboard Hot 100: "Squabble Up" and "Luther". The latter spent 13 consecutive weeks at number one.

== Studio albums ==
List of studio albums, with selected chart positions, sales figures, and certifications
Title	Album details	Peak chart positions										Sales (Note: Pure sales and not equivalent units (streaming and song downloads))	Certifications
Title	Album details	US	US R&B/HH	AUS	CAN	DEN	GER	FRA	IRL	NZ	UK	Sales	Certifications
Section.80	Released: July 2, 2011; Label: Top Dawg; Formats: CD, digital download, streaming	113	21	—	—	—	—	—	—	—	—	US: 130,000 (Note: US album sales for Section.80 as of July 2016:); UK: 27,348	RIAA: Platinum; BPI: Silver; IFPI DEN: Gold; RMNZ: Platinum
Good Kid, M.A.A.D City	Released: October 22, 2012; Label: Top Dawg, Aftermath, Interscope; Formats: CD, LP, digital download, streaming	2	1	23	2	20	47	57	26	7	16	US: 1,720,000 (Note: US album sales for Good Kid, M.A.A.D City as of April 2018:)	RIAA: 3× Platinum; ARIA: 3× Platinum; BPI: 2× Platinum; BVMI: Gold; IFPI DEN: 3× Platinum; MC: Gold; RMNZ: 7× Platinum
To Pimp a Butterfly	Released: March 16, 2015; Label: Top Dawg, Aftermath, Interscope; Formats: CD, LP, digital download, streaming	1	1	1	1	3	17	7	6	1	1	US: 1,050,000 (Note: US album sales for To Pimp a Butterfly as of April 2018:)	RIAA: Platinum; ARIA: Platinum; BPI: Platinum; BVMI: Gold; IFPI DEN: 2× Platinum; MC: 2× Platinum; RMNZ: 3× Platinum
Damn	Released: April 14, 2017; Label: Top Dawg, Aftermath, Interscope; Formats: CD, LP, digital download, streaming	1	1	2	1	2	6	3	2	2	2	US: 1,002,000 (Note: US album sales for Damn as of April 2018:)	RIAA: 3× Platinum; ARIA: 3× Platinum; BPI: 2× Platinum; BVMI: Gold; IFPI DEN: 4× Platinum; MC: 4× Platinum; RMNZ: 7× Platinum; SNEP: 2× Platinum
Mr. Morale & the Big Steppers	Released: May 13, 2022; Label: PGLang, Top Dawg, Aftermath, Interscope; Formats: CD, LP, cassette, digital download, streaming	1	1	1	1	1	3	3	1	1	2	US: 177,000	ARIA: Gold; BPI: Gold; IFPI DEN: Platinum; RMNZ: Platinum; SNEP: Gold
GNX	Released: November 22, 2024; Labels: PGLang, Interscope; Format: CD, LP, cassette, digital download, streaming	1	1	1	1	1	4	11	1	1	1		ARIA: Gold; BPI: Gold; BVMI: Gold; IFPI DEN: Platinum; RMNZ: 2× Platinum; SNEP: Gold
"—" denotes a recording that did not chart or was not released in that territory.

== Compilation albums ==
List of compilation albums, with selected chart positions
Title	Album details	Peak chart positions										Sales	Certifications
Title	Album details	US	US R&B/HH	AUS	CAN	DEN	FRA	GER	IRL	NZ	UK	Sales	Certifications
Untitled Unmastered	Released: March 4, 2016; Label: Top Dawg, Aftermath, Interscope; Formats: CD, LP, Digital download, streaming	1	1	3	1	13	45	55	9	5	7	US: 320,000; UK: 37,059	BPI: Silver; RMNZ: Gold

== Soundtrack albums ==
List of soundtrack albums, with selected chart positions
Title	Album details	Peak chart positions										Sales	Certifications
Title	Album details	US	US R&B/HH	AUS	CAN	DEN	FRA	GER	NZ	SWE	UK	Sales	Certifications
Black Panther: The Album (with various artists)	Released: February 9, 2018; Label: Top Dawg, Aftermath, Interscope; Formats: CD, LP, digital download, streaming	1	1	2	1	1	12	93	2	1	— (Note: Black Panther: The Album did not enter the UK Albums Chart, but peaked at number two on the UK R&B Albums Chart, and at number nine on the UK Compilations Chart.)	US: 280,000	RIAA: Platinum; ARIA: Gold; BPI: Silver; IFPI DEN: Platinum; MC: 2× Platinum; RMNZ: 3× Platinum; SNEP: Platinum
"—" denotes a recording that did not chart.

== EPs ==
List of extended plays, with selected details
Title	EP details	Ref.
Kendrick Lamar	Released: December 31, 2009; Label: Top Dawg; Formats: Digital download	

== Mixtapes ==
List of mixtapes, with selected chart positions and sales figures
Title	Mixtape details	Peak chart positions		Sales
Title	Mixtape details	US R&B/HH	US Heat	Sales
Youngest Head Nigga in Charge (Hub City Threat: Minor of the Year) (as K.Dot)	Released: 2003, 2004 or 2005; Label: Konkrete Jungle Muzik; Formats: CD	—	—	
Training Day (as K.Dot)	Released: February 16, 2007; Label: Top Dawg; Formats: CD, free download	—	—	
No Sleep 'Til NYC (as K.Dot, with Jay Rock)	Released: December 24, 2007; Label: Top Dawg; Formats: CD, digital download	—	—	
C4 (as K.Dot)	Released: January 30, 2009; Label: Top Dawg; Formats: CD, digital download	—	—	
Overly Dedicated	Released: September 14, 2010; Label: Top Dawg; Formats: CD, digital download, streaming	72	46	US: 12,000 (Note: US mixtape sales for Overly Dedicated as of October 2012:)
"—" denotes a recording that did not chart.

== Unreleased albums ==
List of unreleased albums, with intended release year and notes
Title	Year	Notes	Ref.
Before I Commit Suicide	2009	Mixtape slated to be released after No Sleep 'Til NYC (2007); Lamar hinted at sharing the project in a 2009 interview; Its title track samples "Time's Up" by O.C.	
Untitled rock album	2020	Rumor initially shared by Billboard's former editorial director Bill Werde on January 11, 2020; Several of Werde's industry friends reportedly indicated that Lamar had finished recording a new album and it was "pulling in more rock sounds"; Werde later clarified that "just because recording had hit a point where folks believe it may be finished — albums go back to the studio all the time after this point, and for a million different reasons"	

== See also ==
- List of Billboard Year-End number-one singles and albums
