= Kendrick Lamar (EP) =

EP by Kendrick Lamar
- Released: December 31, 2009
- Recorded: 2009
- Studio: TDE Red Room (Carson, California)
- Genre: Hip-hop
- Length: 62:28
- Label: TDE
- Producer: Dude Dawg (exec.); Dee.Jay.Dave (exec.); Sounwave (exec.); Black Milk; The Foreign Exchange; Insomnia; Jake One; King Blue; Pete Rahk; Q-Tip; Wyldfyer

Kendrick Lamar chronology
| C4 (2009) | Kendrick Lamar (2009) | Overly Dedicated (2010) |

Kendrick Lamar (also referred to as The Kendrick Lamar EP) is the debut extended play (EP) by American rapper Kendrick Lamar. It was released on December 31, 2009, through Top Dawg Entertainment (TDE), as a free digital download. It is Lamar's first project to be released under his modern stage name; he previously released music under the stage name K.Dot from 2003 to late 2009.

Production on Kendrick Lamar was handled by Sounwave, Black Milk, Jake One, Q-Tip and Wyldfyer, among others. It features guest appearances from Angela McCluskey, Ab-Soul, JaVonte, Jay Rock, BJ the Chicago Kid, Punch, Schoolboy Q and Big Pooh. The EP premiered exclusively on DatPiff, and has since been downloaded over one million times on the platform.

== Critical reception ==
Shawn Setaro of Complex appreciated the EP for sharing a glimpse of Lamar's artistry, adding that the reason why the project has resonated with audiences years after its release is because of his consistency. He also noted that several themes and characters that would be the focal point in Lamar's later albums, such as the title of Good Kid, M.A.A.D City (2012), were introduced for the first time on Kendrick Lamar. Writing for HotNewHipHop, Caleb Hardy described the EP as a "straining" listen. He criticized the "half-baked" nature of its production and songwriting, but acknowledged it as an admirable and engaging project.

Echoing Setaro's statements, Rolling Stone's Mosi Reeves characterized Kendrick Lamar as a Rosetta Stone of songwriting ideas that Lamar would later delve into on future albums. He praised the EP as being the first standout project of his career, describing it as "redolent of peak blog-rap," and applauded Lamar for eschewing the excessive freestyling over radio hit singles from his previous mixtapes in favor of a project that focuses on his writing and accompanied by "lovely yet doleful production." Reeves believed that although Kendrick Lamar did not receive the mainstream recognition that he felt it deserved, the "cathartic" EP restored Lamar's reputation and anticipation for new music following the overwhelmingly negative reception surrounding his third solo mixtape, C4 (2009).

== Track listing ==
| No. | Title | Writer(s) | Producer(s) | Length |
|---|---|---|---|---|
| 1. | "Is It Love" (featuring Angela McCluskey) | Kendrick Duckworth; McCluskey; Mark Spears | Sounwave | 4:00 |
| 2. | "Celebration" | Duckworth; Spears; Gene McDaniels; Nat Adderley | Sounwave | 3:51 |
| 3. | "P & P" (featuring Ab-Soul) | Duckworth; Herbert Stevens IV; Brandon Blue; Tariq Trotter; Ahmir Thompson; Karl B. Jenkins; James Gray; Khari Mateen; Leonard Hubbard | King Blue (of Sore Losers) | 4:42 |
| 4. | "She Needs Me" (featuring JaVonté) | Duckworth; JaVonté Pollard; Spears; Dimitri Grimm | Sounwave | 3:31 |
| 5. | "I Am (Interlude)" | Duckworth; Kamaal Fareed | Q-Tip | 1:20 |
| 6. | "Wanna Be Heard" | Duckworth; Curtis Cross | Black Milk | 4:37 |
| 7. | "I Do This" (featuring Jay Rock) | Duckworth; Johnny McKinzie; Spears; Bill Withers; Melvin Dunlap; Raymond Jackson | Sounwave | 4:08 |
| 8. | "Uncle Bobby & Jason Keaton" (featuring JaVonté) | Duckworth; Pollard | Insomnia | 4:00 |
| 9. | "Faith" (featuring BJ the Chicago Kid and Punch) | Duckworth; Terrence Henderson Jr.; Bryan Sledge; Blue; Thomas Brenneck; Dave Guy; Leon Michels; Fernando Velez; Homer Steinweiss | King Blue | 4:51 |
| 10. | "Trip" | Duckworth; Spears | Sounwave | 3:50 |
| 11. | "Vanity Slaves" | Duckworth; Phonte Coleman; Matthijs Rook | The Foreign Exchange | 4:15 |
| 12. | "Far From Here" (featuring Schoolboy Q) | Duckworth; Quincy Hanley; Jacob Dutton | Jake One | 3:53 |
| 13. | "Thanksgiving" (featuring Big Pooh) | Duckworth; Thomas Jones III; Wyatt Coleman | Wyldfyer | 3:39 |
| 14. | "Let Me Be Me" | Duckworth; Pete Rahk | Rahk | 7:20 |
| Total length: | | | | 62:28 |

Bonus track
| No. | Title | Writer(s) | Producer | Length |
|---|---|---|---|---|
| 15. | "Determined" (featuring Ash Riser) | Duckworth; Ash Riser; Spears; Lamont Dozier | Sounwave | 4:31 |

Sample credits

- "Is It Love" contains a sample of "Don't Look Back", as performed by Telepopmusik and Angela McCluskey.
- "Celebration" contains a sample of "Hummin'", written by Nat Adderley and Gene McDaniels, as performed by Roy Ayers.
- "P&P" contains a sample of "Clock With No Hands", written by Tariq Trotter, Ahmir Thompson, Karl B. Jenkins, James Gray, Khari Mateen and Leonard Hubbard; as performed by The Roots featuring Mercedes Martinez.
- "She Needs Me" contains samples of "Byrdshot and Bye", written by Dimitri Grimm; as performed by Dimlite; and "Long Red", written by Leslie West, Felix Pappalardi, John Ventura and Norman Landsberg, as performed by Mountain. The song also contains a drum sample from "Let's Ride", as performed by Q-Tip.
- "I Am (Interlude)" contains a sample of "Believe", written by Kamaal Fareed, as performed by Q-Tip featuring D'Angelo.
- "Wanna Be Heard" is a remix of "Popular Demand", as written, performed and produced by Black Milk.
- "I Do This" contains a sample of "Don't You Want to Stay", written by Bill Withers, Melvin Dunlap and Raymond Jackson, as performed by Withers.
- "Faith" contains a sample of "Tired of Fighting", written by Thomas Brenneck, Dave Guy, Leon Michels, Fernando Velez and Homer Steinweiss; as performed by Menahan Street Band.
- "Vanity Slaves" is a remix of "Daykeeper", as performed by The Foreign Exchange featuring Muhsinah, and produced by Nicolay.
- "Thanksgiving" contains samples of "Almost Like Being in Love", composed by Frederick Loewe and written by Alan Jay Lerner; as performed by Nat King Cole, and "Long Red", as performed by Mountain.
- "Determined" contains samples of "Family", as written and performed by Lamont Dozier, and interpolates "Touch the Sky", as performed by Kanye West featuring Lupe Fiasco.
