= Lamin Fofana =

Lamin Fofana is an electronic music producer, DJ, and artist. Fofana grew up in Sierra Leone and Guinea before moving to the United States when he was a teenager.

With a repertoire consisting of instrumental electronic, experimental, ambient and techno music, Fofana explores themes of displacement, identity and immigration, drawing inspiration from his own life and the migrant experience at large. Fofana spent most of his early childhood in Freetown, Sierra Leone until the civil war of the 1990s forced his family to flee to Guinea. When he was just a teenager, his family relocated once more to the United States where he split his time between Harlem, New York and Alexandria, Virginia. This move to the west and its inherent unfamiliarities shaped his understanding of the world at an impressionable age, pushing him to explore more experimental forms of artistic expression to give voice to his experiences and those of people like him. The artist's eclectic music is also greatly influenced by the diverse musical styles he was exposed to as he moved from one location to the next.

He began producing music at the age of 16 years and progressed to DJing a few years later. His debut EP, What Elijah Said, was released in 2010, while his music label, Sci-Fi & Fantasy, was founded in 2012. Sci-Fi & Fantasy is known for representing Berlin based artist Lotic and New York City based artists Max McFerren and Lou DiBenedetto's Headlock project. Fofana has released a series of albums and has exhibited artistic installations and debuted performances of original compositions at various events including WITNESS at the 57th Venice Biennale, Italy (2017), Refracted Gazes/Fugitive Dreams at Akademie Schloss Solitude, Stuttgart, Germany (2019), BLUES at Mishkin Gallery at Baruch College, The City University of New York (2020), Life and Death by Water for the Liverpool Biennial 2021 at Lewis's Building, Liverpool, England, a call to disorder at Haus der Kunst, Munich, Germany (2021), and the Preis der Nationalgalerie group exhibition at Hamburger Bahnhof, Berlin, Germany (2021). His releases include Black Metamorphosis, Darkwater, and Blues (an album trilogy).

== Discography ==
Name	Format	Date of Release	Record label	Tracklist
What Elijah Said	EP	September 21, 2010	Dutty Artz	1. Happy 2010 // Dark Days Are Coming; 2. I Will Admonish You and Give You; 3. What Elijah Said // Eye on the Evil; 4. Dance in Yr Blood
Dubious Prey	EP	January 30, 2012	Sticks "N" Stones Recordings	1. Dubious Prey; 2. Brokedown City; 3. Brokedown City (Aramak Remix)
Africans Are Real	EP	October 2, 2012	Dutty Artz	1. Boo Forever; 2. Africans Are Real; 3. Africans Are Real (DJ Rupture Enamel Remix); 4. Africans Are Real (Spoek Mathambo Par Express Remix); 5. Africans Are Real (Chief Boima "Africans Are Myths" Remix)
Like White Lightning Up A Black Snake's Ass	EP	April 2, 2013	Sci-Fi & Fantasy	1. Like White Lightning Up A Black Snake's Ass; 2. %-} (Dizzy)
First Symphony	EP	August 1, 2014	Sci-Fi & Fantasy	1. First Exit; 2. Two-Spirit; 3. Unidentified (Long Mix)
Another World	EP	August 3, 2015	Sci-Fi & Fantasy	1. Lampedusa; 2. Another World; 3. Plume (Realist Mix)
New Horizons	EP	September 14, 2015	Sci-Fi & Fantasy	1. Flyby; 2. Phone Home; 3. Black Space
Doubleworld	Album	November 16, 2016	Sci-Fi & Fantasy	1. Strange Angels; 2. When the Fever Breaks; 3. The Eclipse; 4. Bifurcate; 5. Workers; 6. The Ultimate / Outsider; 7. Incandescent; 8. The Dithering; 9. A Symbol of the Withdrawn God; 10. Flageolet Xmple
Brancusi Sculpting Beyonce	Album	July 20, 2018	Hundebiss	1. Searching for Memory; 2. Confrontation; 3. Brancusi Sculpting Beyonce; 4. Raffia Arms; 5. Unknown Riddim; 6. The Black God Cries Sometimes Too
Black Metamorphosis	Album	November 1, 2019	Sci-F-i & Fantasy	1. I'm Your Question; 2. Dawn; 3. Cosmic Injuries; 4. Sono; 5. Enchantment; 6. Artifacts of Displacement; 7. Black Metamorphosis; 8. I Sail the Dark River (Edit)
Darkwater	Album	June 5, 2020	Black Studies	1. The Souls of White Folk; 2. Re-Enchantment; 3. Darkwater; 4. Plenum; 5. I ran from it and was still in it
Blues	Album	July 2, 2020	Black Studies	1. After Rain; 2. Emanation; 3. In the Ravine; 4. Blues; 5. And All the Birds Sing Bass
