= Duval Timothy =

English music producer (born 1989)

- Born: 2 October 1989 (age 37); London, England, UK
- Genre: Hip hop · nu jazz · postminimalism
- Occupation: Pianist · composer · music producer
- Labels: I Should Care; Carrying Colour
- Website: duvaltimothy.co.uk

Duval Kojo Bankole Timothy (born 2 October 1989) is a pianist, composer, and music producer based in London, England and Freetown, Sierra Leone. He has released four solo albums, an EP titled 2 Sim in 2018, and the split album Son with Rosie Lowe in 2021. His music incorporates themes of hip hop, nu jazz, and postminimalism. He has produced songs for a variety of artists including Kendrick Lamar, Solange, Vegyn, Nosaj Thing, Mount Kimbie, Mr. Mitch, and Loyle Carner.

Timothy is also an avid photographer, videographer, visual artist, and cook.

== Early life ==
Timothy was born on October 2, 1989, in London, England. His mother is English and his father is of Sierra Leonean and Ghanaian descent. He began playing piano at the age of 13, inspired by artists like Amy Winehouse. He graduated from Central Saint Martins with a Bachelor of Fine Arts.

== Career ==
Timothy wrote and recorded his first album DUKOBANTI while in school in 2012. In 2016, he released his second album Brown Loop with I Should Care Records. The album was out of print for several years before being re-released in 2020 under his personal label.

During the period of 2011 to 2016, Timothy and collaborators Folayemi Brown and Jacob Fodio Todd ran a pop-up restaurant called The Groundnut in South London, serving sub-Saharan African dishes twice a month. In 2015, Timothy, Brown, and Todd published The Groundnut Cookbook through Penguin, which features recipes served at the restaurant.

His third album Sen Am was released in 2017. The title means 'send it' in Krio; the album samples WhatsApp messages from family and friends in Sierra Leone with solo piano compositions. The Guardian called the album "an immersive, cross-cultural dialogue".

In 2017, he created Carrying Colour, a record label and clothing/lifestyle brand. He recorded his fourth album Son with Rosie Lowe at the label's studio in Freetown. A children's book with the same name was created featuring illustrations by Timothy and Lowe.

Timothy released the extended play "2 Sim" in 2018. It was created from two months of field recordings and interviews with family and friends in Freetown. It was accompanied by a short film of the same name. He released his third album Help in 2020, featuring diverse instrumentals from various other artists in London. In 2022, Timothy released Meeting with a Judas Tree, a short album incorporating more synth strains.

In recent years, he has collaborated with several hip-hop artists providing piano and album production. His instrumentals are featured on a song from Solange's When I Get Home and four tracks from Kendrick Lamar's Mr. Morale & the Big Steppers.

== Personal life ==
Timothy has participated in a variety of local art projects such as weaving sustainable fabrics in Freetown, designing tapestries in New Orleans and Chicago, and constructing a football pitch at the Trinity Buoy Wharf in London. He also sells homemade ginger beer on the streets around the United Kingdom, a recipe for which is included in The Groundnut Cookbook, a cookbook created by Timothy, Folayemi Brown and Jacob Fodio Todd in 2015.

He only wears blue clothing in homage to the "blue borough" of Lewisham where he grew up.

== Discography ==
=== Albums ===
- DUKOBANTI (2012)
- Brown Loop (2016)
- Sen Am (2018)
- Help (2020)
- Son (with Rosie Lowe) (2021)
- Meeting with a Judas Tree (2022)
- wishful thinking (2025)
- Rain Music (with Carlos Niño) (2026)

=== Soundtracks ===
- My Father's Shadow (with CJ Mirra) (2026)

=== Singles and EPs ===
- "Ibs, Pt. 2" (2017)
- "2 Sim" (2018)
- "DYE" (2019)
- "Kam" (2023)
- "Shower" (2025)
- "sleep" (2025)
- "Journey to Lagos (From 'My Father's Shadow')" (with CJ Mirra) (2026)

=== Production ===
- "United in Grief" – Kendrick Lamar
- "Father Time ft. Sampha" – Kendrick Lamar
- "Rich Interlude" – Kendrick Lamar
- "Crown" – Kendrick Lamar
- "Mushroom Abolitionist" – Vegyn
- "Sometimes I Feel Like I’m Ruining Songs" – Vegyn
- "Fake Life" – Vegyn
- "Dreams" – Solange
- "DVD" – Mount Kimbie
- "Continua" – Nosaj Thing
- "Make Time" – Mr. Mitch
- "Lost Touch" – Mr. Mitch
- "Carluccio" – Loyle Carner
- "Dreams Of You Are Too Much To Speak" – Cktrl
- "Lighthouse" – Cktrl
- "Robyn" – Cktrl
- "Will The Feelings Leave" – Cktrl
- "Fw Circle" – Cktrl
- "Reset Walking" – Martyn
- "Knopperz" – Dave Okumu
