= Yu Su =

- Born: 1999 or 2000; Kaifeng, Henan, China
- Origin: Vancouver, British Columbia, Canada
- Genres: Electronic; ambient; experimental
- Occupations: DJ; record producer; composer; sound artist
- Years active: 2014–present (making music since 2014)
- Label: bié (her label)<
- Website: ninjatune.net/artist/yu-su

Yu Su (born 1999 or 2000) is an electronic dance music producer and DJ.

== Biography ==
She was born in Kaifeng, China, and moved to Vancouver, Canada, in 2013. She started to produce music the following year and after a tour of mainland China in 2019 from Qingdao to Xining, she set up the record label bié in order to release the music of the artists she had met. In 2020, she self-released her debut album Yellow River Blue. The Quietus review called it "warm and inviting", whilst Pitchfork described the songs as a mixture of "ambient dub, synth pop, and left-field house".
