= Rosie Lowe =

English singer (born 1989)

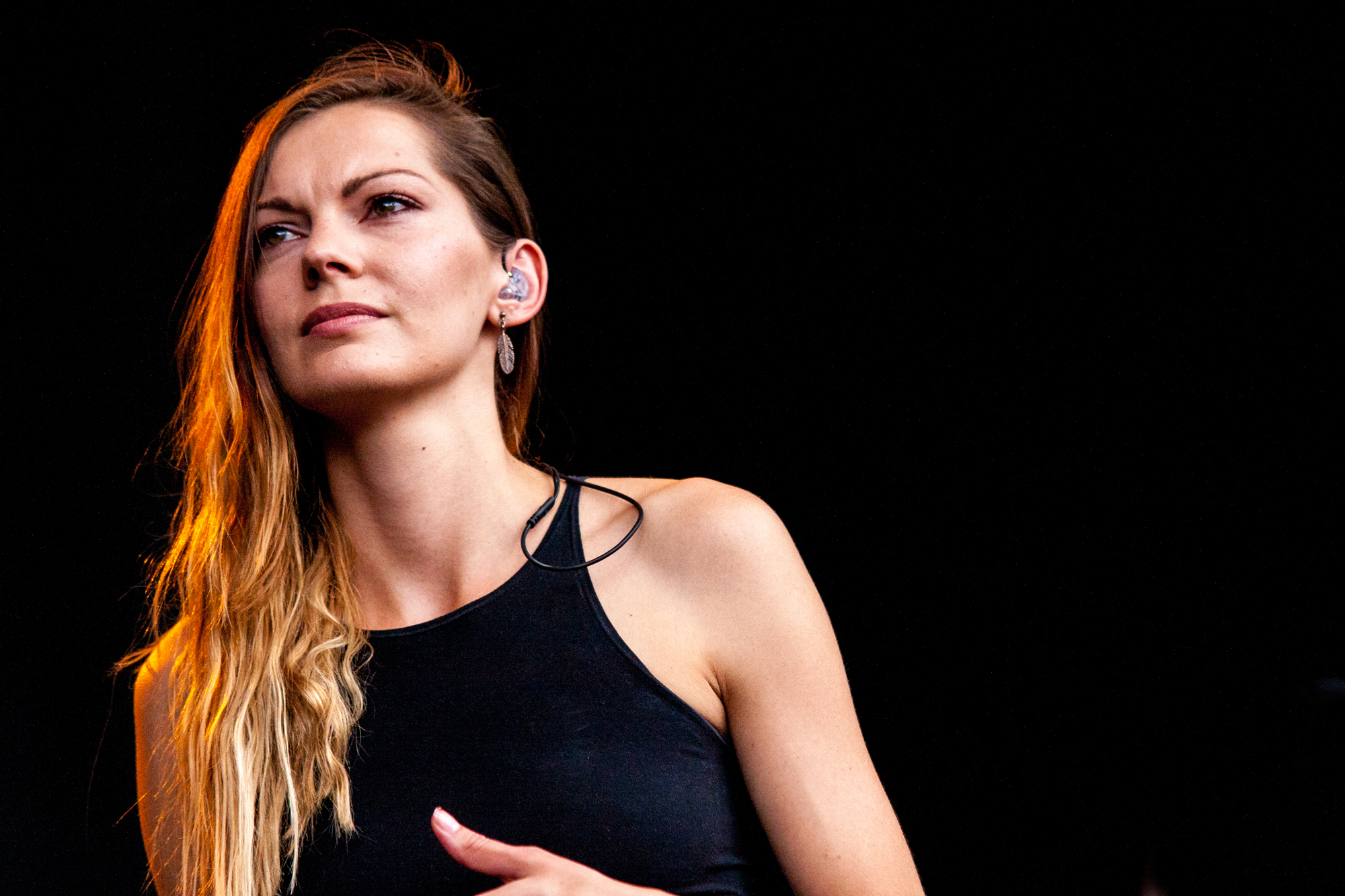
- Lowe performing at the Tramlines Festival in 2014

Background information
- Born: 24 December 1989 (age 36); Devon, England
- Genres: Electronic soul; R&B; alternative; indietronica
- Occupations: Singer; songwriter; producer
- Years active: 2013–present
- Labels: Wolf Tone; Polydor

Rosie Lowe (born 24 December 1989) is an English singer and songwriter. She rose to prominence with her debut single "Right Thing", released in November 2013. She released her debut extended play under the same name the following year. Her 2016 debut album Control contains the singles "Worry 'Bout Us", "Woman", and, featuring vocals from rapper Little Simz, "So Human". "Woman" was featured in the soundtrack for the 2017 film The Last Word.

After a hiatus, in November 2018 she released the single "The Light" and announced her forthcoming second album and 2019 tour dates. Her second album, YU, was released in May 2019, and she toured again in 2020.

In 2021 she released the EP Now, You Know, and the album Son, a collaborative project with Duval Timothy with an accompanying children's book. In 2024 she released the album Lover, Other.

== Discography ==
=== Studio albums ===
- Control (2016)
- YU (2019)
- Son (with Duval Timothy) (2021)
- Lover, Other (2024)

=== EPs ===
- Right Thing EP (2014)
- Now, You Know (2021)

=== Singles ===
==== As lead artist ====
- "Right Thing" (2013)
- "Games" (2014)
- "Water Came Down" (2014)
- "How'd You Like It" (2014)
- "Who's That Girl?" (2015)
- "Worry Bout Us" (2015)
- "Woman" (2016)
- "So Human" (2016) (featuring Little Simz)
- "The Light" (2018)
- "Birdsong" (2019)
- "Pharoah" (2019)
- "The Way" (2019) (featuring Jay Electronica)
- "Mood to Make Love" (2024)

==== As featured artist ====
- "What Is This" (2017) (Machinedrum featuring Rosie Lowe)
- "Everything" (2020) (Gotts Street Park featuring Rosie Lowe)
- "Obsession" (2021) (Shura featuring Rosie Lowe)
- "Summer Breeze" (2022) (Gotts Street Park featuring Rosie Lowe)
