= C4 (mixtape) =

Mixtape by K.Dot
- Released: January 30, 2009
- Recorded: 2008
- Genre: Hip-hop
- Length: 77:13
- Label: TDE
- Producers: The Alchemist; Bangladesh; Cha Lo; Cool & Dre; D. Smith; DJ Ill Will; DJ Infamous; Dave Free; David Banner; Deezle; Drew Correa; Kanye West; Maestro; Mousa; Play-N-Skillz; RZA; Robin Thicke; Rodnae; Sounwave; StreetRunner; Swizz Beatz; T-Pain; The Neptunes

K.Dot chronology
No Sleep 'Til NYC (2007)	C4 (2009)	Kendrick Lamar (2009)

C4 is the third solo mixtape (fourth overall) by American rapper Kendrick Lamar, then known as K.Dot, released on January 30, 2009, through Top Dawg Entertainment (TDE). Heavily inspired by Lil Wayne's sixth studio album Tha Carter III (2008), the mixtape primarily consists of freestyles over the production from Tha Carter III, in addition to a few original songs. C4 includes guest appearances from Lamar's TDE label-mates Ab-Soul, Punch, Jay Rock, Schoolboy Q, and BO.

== Critical reception ==
When retrospectively speaking on the mixtape, Mosi Reeves of Rolling Stone described it as "a wrongheaded homage to a year-old, well-worn album". Peter A. Berry of XXL wrote: "Compared to what he would evolve into over the next five years, fans have argued that the rapper didn't really find himself or his sound by the time this project came out. K-Dot's starpower resided in the future rather than present at this point in his catalog."

== Track listing ==
C4 track listing
No.	Title	Writer(s)	Producer(s)	Length
1.	"Intro"	Kendrick Duckworth; Dwayne Carter, Jr.; Johnny McKinzie	Dave Free; DJ III Will	0:22
2.	"Best Rapper Under 25"	Duckworth	Maestro	3:15
3.	"Mr. Carter 2 (New Wayne Verse)"	Duckworth; Carter, Jr.	DJ Infamous; Drew Correa	4:12
4.	"A Milli"	Duckworth	Cha Lo; Bangladesh	3:13
5.	"Bitch I'm in the Club"	Duckworth	T-Pain; Play-N-Skillz	2:38
6.	"West Coast Wu Tang" (featuring Ab-Soul and Punch)	Duckworth; Terrence Henderson Jr.; Herbert Stevens IV	RZA	4:22
7.	"Phone Home" (featuring Punch)	Duckworth; Henderson Jr.	Cool & Dre	2:51
8.	"Compton Chemistry"	Duckworth	Swizz Beatz	2:22
9.	"Take Off Your Pants" (performed by Ab-Soul)	Stevens IV	Robin Thicke	3:40
10.	"Shot Down" (featuring Punch)	Duckworth; Henderson Jr.	D. Smith	4:23
11.	"Play With Fire"	Duckworth	StreetRunner	4:27
12.	"Friend of Mine"	Duckworth	The Neptunes	5:05
13.	"Still Hustlin" (featuring Ab-Soul and Jay Rock)	Duckworth	David Banner	4:25
14.	"Welcome to C4" (featuring Ab-Soul, Jay Rock, Schoolboy Q and BO)	Duckworth; Stevens IV; McKinzie; Quincy Hanley; BO	The Alchemist	6:41
15.	"G Code"	Duckworth	Kanye West; Deezle	4:01
16.	"Famous Pipe Game" (featuring Ab-Soul)	Duckworth; Stevens IV	Deezle	3:10
17.	"Misunderstood" (featuring Jay Rock)	Duckworth; McKinzie	Rodnae; Mousa	4:44
18.	"Young & Black" (Bonus track)	Duckworth	Sounwave	3:22
Total length:				77:13

Notes

- "Best Rapper Under 25" is a remix of "3 Peat" by Lil Wayne.
- "Mr. Carter 2 (New Wayne Verse)" is a remix of "Mr. Carter" by Lil Wayne and Jay-Z.
- "A Milli" is a remix of "A Milli" by Lil Wayne.
- "Bitch I'm In the Club" is a remix of "Got Money" by Lil Wayne and T-Pain.
- "West Coast Wu Tang" samples "After Laughter (Comes Tears)" by Wendy Rene and interpolates "Bring the Pain" by Method Man and "Method Man" by Wu-Tang Clan.
- "Phone Home" is a remix of "Phone Home" by Lil Wayne.
- "Compton Chemistry" is a remix of "Dr. Carter" by Lil Wayne.
- "Take Off Your Pants" is a remix of "Tie My Hands" by Lil Wayne and Robin Thicke.
- "Shot Down" is a remix of "Shoot Me Down" by Lil Wayne.
- "Play with Fire" is a remix of "Playing with Fire" by Lil Wayne and Betty Wright.
- "Friend of Mine" samples "I Just Wanna Love U (Give it 2 Me)" by Jay-Z and Pharrell Williams.
- "Still Hustlin" is a remix of La La by Lil Wayne, Brisco, and Busta Rhymes.
- "Welcome to C4" is a remix of "You Ain't Got Nuthin" by Lil Wayne, Fabolous, and Juelz Santana.
- "G Code" is a remix of "Let the Beat Build" by Lil Wayne.
- "Famous Pipe Game" is a remix of "Mrs. Officer" by Lil Wayne, Bobby V, and Kidd Kidd.
- "Misunderstood" is a remix of "DontGetIt" by Lil Wayne.
- "Young & Black" samples "99 Problems" by Jay-Z.
