= Wyldfyer =

American music producer initially

- Origin: Philadelphia, Pennsylvania
- Genres: Hip hop, pop, rock, R&B, gospel, alternative, trip hop
- Occupations: Producer, Songwriter, Composer
- Instruments: Piano, guitar, violin, bass
- Years active: 2005-present
- Website: Twitter, www.myspace.com/wyldfyer

Wyldfyer is an American music producer.

== Production discography ==
Year	Artist	Album	Produced track(s)
2005	Missy Elliott	The Cookbook	"Time and Time Again" (engineer)
2005	Nas, DJ Clue?	Fidel Cashflow	"Death Anniversary"
2006	Nas	Hip Hop Is Dead	"Money Over Bullshit"; "Hope"
2006	Nas, Jay-Z	Hip Hop Is Dead	"Black Republican"
2008	Nas	Grand Theft Auto IV	"War Is Necessary"
2008	Sha Stimuli featuring Skyzoo	March on Washington	"Black President"
2008	Hydro featuring Busta Rhymes	Crowd Goes Wild	"Crowd Goes Wild"
2008	Ludacris	Theater of the Mind	"Last of a Dying Breed" (featuring Lil Wayne); "I Do It for Hip Hop" (featuring Nas and Jay-Z)
2009	Sha Stimuli	The Break-Up	"In Between"
2009	Kendrick Lamar	Kendrick Lamar	"Today"; "Thanksgiving" (featuring Big Pooh)
2009	Schoolboy Q	Gangsta & Soul	"Take the Pain Away"
2010	Jay Rock	Black Friday	"Trapped in the Hood"
2010	Kendrick Lamar	Overly Dedicated	"Average Joe"
2011	Kendrick Lamar	Section.80	"Kush & Corinthians (His Pain)" (featuring BJ the Chicago Kid)
2011	Terrace Martin	Locke High 2	"Lithium" (featuring Ab-Soul and Punch)
2012	Chino XL	RICANstruction: The Black Rosary	"Anything"; "Bad Man Bible"; "Arm Yourself" (featuring DV Alias Khryst, Sick Jacken and Immortal Technique); "Hellsong" (featuring Tech N9ne)
2020	Blakk Soul	Take Your Time	"Take Your Time"
2020	Junii	Don't Stand Too Close Vol. 1	"Kendrick's Theory"; "Offering"
2022	Westside Boogie	More Black Superheroes	"LOLSMH II"
2022	Dreamville (Lute, Cozz and Omen)	D-Day: A Gangsta Grillz Mixtape	"Starting 5"
2024	Punch	Aroomfullofmirrors	"Come To Past"
2025	Raekwon featuring Marsha Ambrosius	The Emperor's New Clothes	"Debra Night Wine"

== Interviews ==
- "Interview : Wyldfyer | Abcdr Du Son". Archived from the original on 2012-07-22.
- "25 Artists That Need To Be Heard: Wyldfyer | The Urban Daily". theurbandaily.com. 2 February 2012.
- "Wyldfyer Interview | The Production Port". Archived from the original on 2012-10-13.
