= Billboard Year-End Hot R&B/Hip-Hop Songs of 2025 =

American music chart

This is a list of Billboard magazine's Top Hot R&B/Hip-Hop Songs of 2025.

No.	Title	Artist(s)
1	"Luther"	Kendrick Lamar and SZA
2	"TV Off"	Kendrick Lamar featuring Lefty Gunplay
3	"Timeless"	The Weeknd and Playboi Carti
4	"30 for 30"	SZA and Kendrick Lamar
5	"Not Like Us"	Kendrick Lamar
6	"Mutt"	Leon Thomas
7	"Squabble Up"	Kendrick Lamar
8	"Nokia"	Drake
9	"Sticky"	Tyler, the Creator featuring GloRilla, Sexyy Red and Lil Wayne
10	"Whatchu Kno About Me"	GloRilla and Sexyy Red
11	"Peekaboo"	Kendrick Lamar featuring AzChike
12	"Cry for Me"	The Weeknd
13	"Anxiety"	Doechii
14	"Burning Blue"	Mariah the Scientist
15	"Somebody Loves Me"	PartyNextDoor and Drake
16	"Like Him"	Tyler, the Creator featuring Lola Young
17	"Denial Is a River"	Doechii
18	"Rather Lie"	Playboi Carti and The Weeknd
19	"Residuals"	Chris Brown
20	"Heart of a Woman"	Summer Walker
21	"Dark Thoughts"	Lil Tecca
22	"No Pole"	Don Toliver
23	"Folded"	Kehlani
24	"Hey Now"	Kendrick Lamar featuring Dody6
25	"Tweaker"	GELO
26	"Yukon"	Justin Bieber
27	"Shake It to the Max (Fly)"	Moliy, Silent Addy, Skillibeng and Shenseea
28	"What Did I Miss?"	Drake
29	"25"	Rod Wave
30	"Gimme a Hug"	Drake
31	"Outside"	Cardi B
32	"St. Chroma"	Tyler, the Creator featuring Daniel Caesar
33	"Help Me"	Real Boston Richey
34	"Whim Whamiee"	Pluto and YKNiece
35	"Wacced Out Murals"	Kendrick Lamar
36	"It Depends"	Chris Brown featuring Bryson Tiller
37	"Are You Even Real"	Teddy Swims featuring Giveon
38	"Went Legit"	G Herbo
39	"2AM"	BigXthaPlug
40	"TGIF"	GloRilla
41	"The Largest"	BigXthaPlug
42	"Typa"	GloRilla
43	"Dodger Blue"	Kendrick Lamar featuring Wallie the Sensei, Siete7x and Roddy Ricch
44	"Evil J0rdan"	Playboi Carti
45	"Little Things"	Ella Mai
46	"Push 2 Start"	Tyla
47	"Sugar on My Tongue"	Tyler, the Creator
48	"I Luv Her"	GloRilla featuring T-Pain
49	"Dum, Dumb, and Dumber"	Lil Baby, Young Thug, and Future
50	"Fat Juicy & Wet"	Sexyy Red and Bruno Mars
51	"Million Dollar Baby"	Tommy Richman
52	"All the Stars"	Kendrick Lamar and SZA
53	"4x4"	Travis Scott
54	"Him All Along"	Gunna
55	"Twenties"	Giveon
56	"Darling, I"	Tyler, the Creator featuring Teezo Touchdown
57	"Gang Baby"	NLE Choppa
58	"Actin Up"	Tommy Richman
59	"Somebody"	Latto
60	"Or What?"	NLE Choppa and 41
61	"Reincarnated"	Kendrick Lamar
62	"Kehlani"	Jordan Adetunji
63	"Which One"	Drake and Central Cee
64	"Nissan Altima"	Doechii
65	"New Drop"	Don Toliver
66	"Holy Ground"	BigXthaPlug and Jessie Murph
67	"Man at the Garden"	Kendrick Lamar
68	"Ring Ring Ring"	Tyler, the Creator
69	"Rah Tah Tah"	Tyler, the Creator
70	"Brokey"	Latto
71	"Lil Demon"	Future
72	"Heart Pt. 6"	Kendrick Lamar
73	"Empty Out Your Pockets"	Juice Wrld
74	"Change Me"	BigXthaPlug
75	"On One Tonight"	Gunna
76	"Noid"	Tyler, the Creator
77	"Is It a Crime"	Mariah the Scientist and Kali Uchis
78	"For Me"	Loe Shimmy featuring Brent Faiyaz
79	"Gloria"	Kendrick Lamar and SZA
80	"Too Fast"	Future
81	"Owa Owa"	Lil Tecca
82	"Blow My High"	Dee Mula
83	"Can't Hide It"	Lil Durk featuring Jhené Aiko
84	"WGFT"	Gunna featuring Burna Boy
85	"Thought I Was Dead"	Tyler, the Creator featuring Schoolboy Q and Santigold
86	"Hello Miss Johnson"	Jack Harlow
87	"Went West"	BabyChiefDoit
88	"Mo Chicken"	BossMan Dlow featuring French Montana
89	"She Ready"	Key Glock
90	"Money on Money"	Young Thug featuring Future
91	"Bodies"	Offset and JID
92	"WTHelly"	Rob49
93	"Shot Callin"	YoungBoy Never Broke Again
94	"Boots on the Ground"	803Fresh
95	"Drive"	SZA
96	"Big Dawgs"	Hanumankind and Kalmi
97	"Outfit"	Lil Baby and 21 Savage
98	"Shake Dat Ass (Twerk Song)"	BossMan Dlow
99	"Good Credit"	Playboi Carti and Kendrick Lamar
100	"Something About You"	PartyNextDoor and Drake

== See also ==
- 2025 in music
- Billboard Year-End Hot 100 singles of 2025
- Billboard Year-End Hot Rap Songs of 2025
- List of Billboard Hot R&B/Hip-Hop Songs number ones of 2025
