= Billboard Year-End Hot Rap Songs of 2025 =

American music chart

This is a list of Billboard magazine's Top Hot Rap Songs of 2025.

Kendrick Lamar becomes the first artist to top the year-end Hot Rap Songs chart in consecutive years. He joins Puff Daddy (1997) and Macklemore & Ryan Lewis (2013) as the only artists to take the top-two spots of the chart, and the first to both take the first four spots and five of the top 10 spots.

No.	Title	Artist(s)
1	"Luther"	Kendrick Lamar and SZA
2	"TV Off"	Kendrick Lamar featuring Lefty Gunplay
3	"Not Like Us"	Kendrick Lamar
4	"Squabble Up"	Kendrick Lamar
5	"Nokia"	Drake
6	"All the Way"	BigXthaPlug featuring Bailey Zimmerman
7	"Sticky"	Tyler, the Creator featuring GloRilla, Sexyy Red and Lil Wayne
8	"Whatchu Kno About Me"	GloRilla and Sexyy Red
9	"Peekaboo"	Kendrick Lamar featuring AzChike
10	"Denial Is a River"	Doechii
11	"Rather Lie"	Playboi Carti and the Weeknd
12	"Dark Thoughts"	Lil Tecca
13	"No Pole"	Don Toliver
14	"Hey Now"	Kendrick Lamar featuring Dody6
15	"What Did I Miss?"	Drake
16	"Tweaker"	Gelo
17	"Outside"	Cardi B
18	"Help Me"	Real Boston Richey
19	"25"	Rod Wave
20	"Whim Whamiee"	Pluto and YKNiece
21	"Went Legit"	G Herbo
22	"Gimme a Hug"	Drake
23	"TGIF"	GloRilla
24	"Wacced Out Murals"	Kendrick Lamar
25	"St. Chroma"	Tyler, the Creator featuring Daniel Caesar
26	"Typa"	GloRilla
27	"Evil J0rdan"	Playboi Carti
28	"Dodger Blue"	Kendrick Lamar featuring Wallie the Sensei, Siete7x and Roddy Ricch
29	"Fat Juicy & Wet"	Sexyy Red and Bruno Mars
30	"4x4"	Travis Scott
31	"Hell at Night"	BigXthaPlug featuring Ella Langley
32	"Reincarnated"	Kendrick Lamar
33	"Kehlani"	Jordan Adetunji
34	"2AM"	BigXthaPlug
35	"Which One"	Drake and Central Cee
36	"Somebody"	Latto
37	"The Largest"	BigXthaPlug
38	"Dum, Dumb, and Dumber"	Lil Baby, Young Thug, and Future
39	"Man at the Garden"	Kendrick Lamar
40	"Gang Baby"	NLE Choppa
41	"Heart Pt. 6"	Kendrick Lamar
42	"Empty Out Your Pockets"	Juice Wrld
43	"Darling, I"	Tyler, the Creator featuring Teezo Touchdown
44	"Noid"	Tyler, the Creator
45	"WGFT"	Gunna featuring Burna Boy
46	"Actin Up"	Tommy Richman
47	"Holy Ground"	BigXthaPlug and Jessie Murph
48	"Rah Tah Tah"	Tyler, the Creator
49	"Gloria"	Kendrick Lamar featuring SZA
50	"I Luv Her"	GloRilla featuring T-Pain

== See also ==
- 2025 in music
- Billboard Year-End Hot 100 singles of 2025
- Billboard Year-End Hot R&B/Hip-Hop Songs of 2025
