= Grand National Tour =

2025 concert tour by Kendrick Lamar and SZA

- Tour by Kendrick Lamar and SZA
- Poster for the co-headlining concerts
- Location: Australia; Europe; North America; South America
- Associated albums: GNX; Lana
- Start date: April 19, 2025
- End date: December 11, 2025
- No. of shows: 47
- Supporting acts: Ca7riel & Paco Amoroso; Doechii; Mustard; Schoolboy Q
- Attendance: 2.037 million
- Box office: $390.7 million
- Website: grandnationaltour.com

Kendrick Lamar concert chronology
- Super Bowl LIX halftime show (2025); Grand National Tour (2025)
SZA tour chronology
SOS Tour (2023–24)	Grand National Tour (2025)

The Grand National Tour was a concert tour by American rapper Kendrick Lamar, in support of his sixth studio album, GNX. It consisted of 47 shows, spanning Europe, North America, Australia, and South America. The tour commenced on April 19, 2025, in Minneapolis, United States, and concluded on December 11, in Sydney, Australia. The North American and European shows were co-headlined by American singer-songwriter SZA in support of Lana (2024), the deluxe reissue of her second studio album SOS (2022). The Grand National Tour was the first all-stadium tour for SZA and Lamar.

Lamar's sets included segments of Anita Baker songs, while SZA's contained segments of other artists' songs. The tour's opening acts were American DJ Mustard for the first stretch of shows in the United States, Canada, and Europe; Argentinian duo Ca7riel & Paco Amoroso for the Latin American shows; and American rappers Doechii and Schoolboy Q for alternate Australian shows. AZ Chike, Baby Keem, Doja Cat, Justin Bieber, Kaytranada, Lizzo, and Playboi Carti had appeared as guest performers.

Many reviewers praised the Grand National Tour for the stage design, Lamar and SZA's showmanship, and their synergy as a duo. Reviewers called the shows a visual spectacle and said that, despite the creative differences between the pair, they were able to show how well they fit together. Some criticism was aimed at the nine-act structure, with reviewers saying that it made the concerts feel disjointed. Following the tour's start, SOS and GNX charted at number one and two on the Billboard 200, respectively. The Seattle show broke the record for the highest-grossing hip hop concert, accumulating $14.811 million from 60,941 tickets sold.

== Background ==
=== Artists' collaborative history ===
Kendrick Lamar and SZA are former labelmates from Top Dawg Entertainment (TDE). (Note: Lamar left the label after his album Mr. Morale & the Big Steppers (2022).) For over a decade, the two collaborated on musical projects, beginning with SZA's 2014 extended play Z. They previously toured with other TDE artists during the Championship Tour (2018).

The pair announced the Grand National Tour on December 3, 2024. The news came 11 days after Lamar's sixth studio album GNX, which included two collaborations with SZA. Like the album, the tour was named after the 1987 Buick Grand National Experimental.

Lamar headlined the Super Bowl LIX halftime show on February 9, 2025, with SZA as a guest performer. The show served as a taste of what the Grand National Tour would be, with elements of the choreography and stage design carrying over.

=== Tour tickets and announcements ===
Two pre-sale options were made available on December 4, 2024: one via the tour's sponsor Cash App, the other via Ticketmaster's Official Platinum program.

Initially planned for 21 shows across the United States and Canada, additional dates were added for Inglewood (Note: Labeled as Los Angeles in promotional material.) and Toronto on December 6.

European dates for the tour were announced on February 10, 2025. Tickets went on general sale on February 14, with various presales running February 12–13. Additional dates were added for Nanterre (Note: Labeled as Paris in promotional material.) and London on February 13 and Frankfurt on February 14.

Mustard was announced as the opening act with his own DJ set on April 1.

Two Australian dates with Lamar performing solo, Melbourne and Sydney, were announced on June 11, with a presale running from June 12–13 and general sale starting June 16. Five more Lamar solo dates in South America were announced on June 27, with Ca7riel & Paco Amoroso as the opening act; tickets for the Argentinian and Colombian shows are expected to be available on July 1 and 4, respectively, while HSBC holders gained access to a presale on July 1 and 2 for the Mexican show.

Schoolboy Q was announced as the opening act for the Australian shows on August 1. Two more Australian dates in the same two venues, with Doechii as the opener instead of Schoolboy Q, were announced on August 5.

== Concert synopsis ==
=== Overview ===
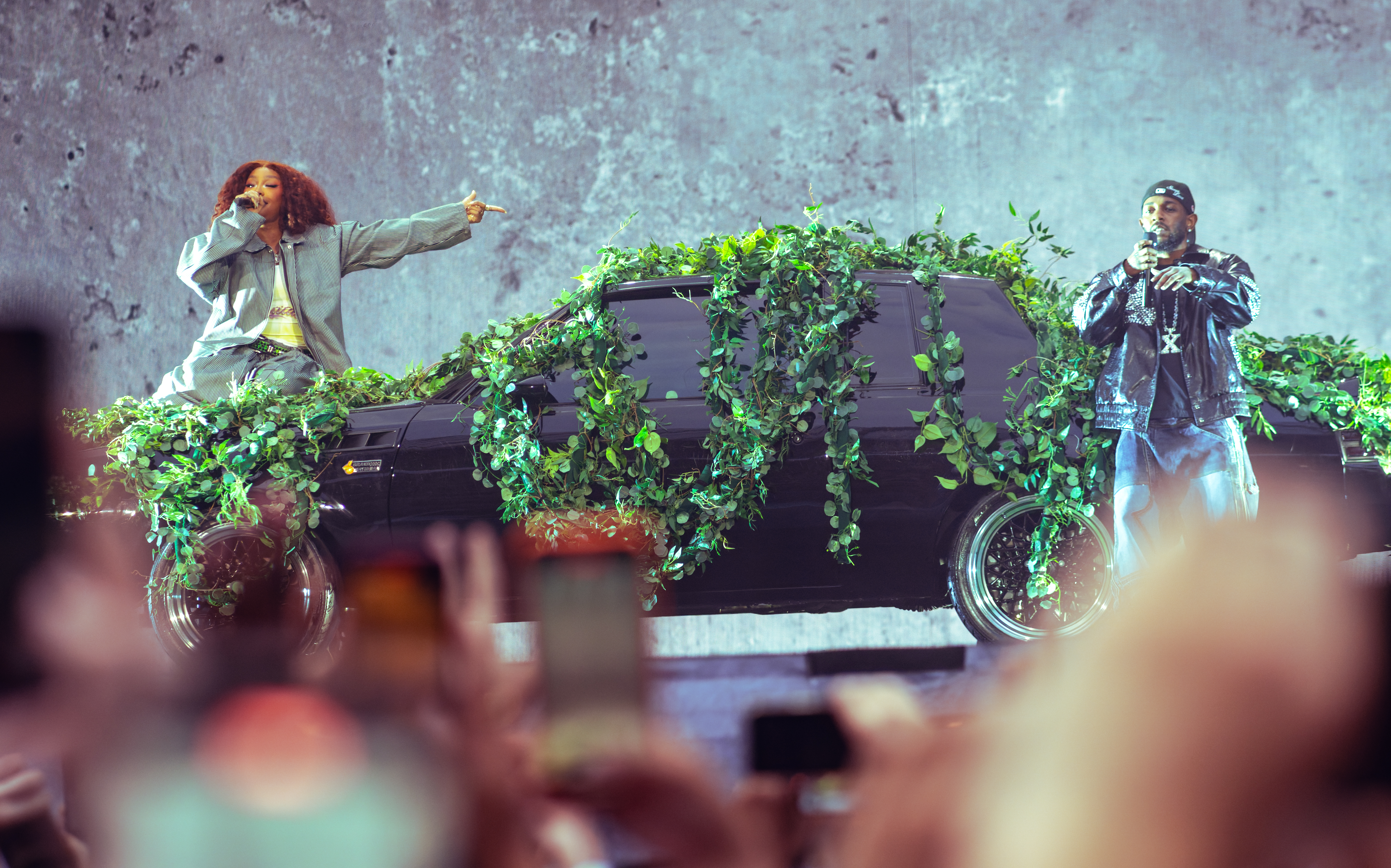
SZA and Lamar performing "30 for 30"

The Grand National Tour concerts are divided into nine acts. Most of them are solo, consisting of performances from either Lamar or SZA. The fifth and ninth acts are the exceptions; during these, the two join each other onstage to duet their collaborations. Some shows feature guest appearances who perform a particular song with Lamar or SZA.

Lamar's sets are mainly lit with a muted color palette, save for a few songs like "Not Like Us". His sets' choreography is characterized by synchronicity and soldier-like movement, incorporating moves like lockstep marching. For the costumes, Lamar and his dancers follow a sharp hip-hop fashion style. Some of Lamar's outfits incorporate beanies, Timberland shoes, and baggy jeans. At times, he is dressed in all-camouflage attire.

In contrast to Lamar, SZA has a more colorful and vibrant set. The props follow a garden and forest theme; vines, leaves, flowers, and ivy constitute some of the stage decor. Bugs are another recurring visual element. Dancers are dressed as praying mantises, and SZA herself wears butterfly wings as part of one outfit. A large ant prop with red eyes, named Anthony, is used for one of the sets. SZA is more involved with the choreography, which is more gracile and free-flowing compared to the more organized and uniform style of Lamar's dancers.

The stage screen occasionally played video interludes in the form of skits. Scenarios include an argument over a gas station drive-thru order, and a deposition with a lawyer. The latter has been called a reference to Canadian rapper Drake's lawsuit over the publication of Lamar's diss track toward Drake, "Not Like Us".

=== Chronology ===
The shows opened with "Wacced Out Murals" as part of Lamar's first solo set. He made his entrance inside a tinted GNX, rising from beneath the stage. Upon his exit from the car, clips of old home videos and nature videos played on the screen, and the pyrotechnics started. Lamar continued the set with "Squabble Up", "King Kunta", and "Element". He followed the three with "TV Off", which was co-produced by Mustard. However, the performance stopped right before the anticipated, drawn-out "Mustaaaaard" scream.

SZA entered the stage to begin the concert's second act with "30 for 30". The returning GNX was overgrown with greenery, surrounded by several vine and leaf props. A forest-themed setting was used onstage, featuring various flowers and ivy. Following "30 for 30", which was a duet with Lamar, SZA performed three songs from her debut studio album Ctrl (2017): "Love Galore", "Broken Clocks", and "The Weekend".

Lamar returned for the concert's third act. He started with "Euphoria", one of the Drake diss tracks included on the set list, as he traversed a circular catwalk. The text "lies about me, truth about you" appeared in red font on the screen. Lamar then accompanied "Hey Now" with a synchronized, marching-style choreography from his dancers; for "Reincarnated", he moved towards a streetlamp prop and performed underneath it. During the song, the dancers were lined up on a staircase and arranged in a diagonal formation. Reimagining and remixing the next few tracks, Lamar added a new verse to "Family Ties", performed "Swimming Pools (Drank)" a cappella, and combined "M.A.A.D City" with Anita Baker's "Sweet Love". For "Man at the Garden", footage of a city that resembled his birthplace of Compton, California, played as he crouched on the GNX's hood.

The fourth act, SZA's second set, began with the rock-infused tracks "Scorsese Baby Daddy" and "F2F". SZA whipped her hair, thrashed, and belted during the performances, similar to how a rock singer would act onstage. The next songs further reinforced the concerts' forest and insect visuals. Dancers dressed as praying mantises flanked SZA during "Garden (Say It like Dat)" as she moved across the stage with a large money note on her back. For "Kitchen", SZA performed while riding Anthony the ant.

Following the fourth act was the concerts' first joint set list. The Houston Chronicle's Joey Guerra wrote that when they were together, SZA "soften[ed] [Lamar's] edges and coax[ed] out more of his playful side". The act included two of the pair's previous collaborations, "Doves in the Wind" and "All the Stars". For the latter, Lamar and SZA stood on opposite ends of the circular runway before being lifted into the air by the platforms below them. SZA also joined Lamar for "Love" (not a collaboration between the two), covering Zacari's verses.

Lamar's reimagining and remixing of songs continued into the sixth act, where "Count Me Out" was merged with elements of "Bitch, Don't Kill My Vibe". Guerra also noted the Last Supper-esque imagery of the "Dodger Blue" performance and the "marvel of technology and timing" of the "DNA" performance. The seventh act saw SZA's return; during this, she performed "Kill Bill" while the screen showed a clip of a female mantis eating her mate's head after intercourse. The video was a reference to the song's lyrics about killing a former romantic partner. After a performance of "Snooze", a harness carried SZA above the stage while wearing two butterfly wings and a long gown. The gown was long enough such that, as she further ascended, it began to resemble a cocoon. Once SZA was suspended high enough, the gown was removed and she switched to the butterfly costume for the next song. (Note: "Saturn" (Lana) or "Nobody Gets Me" (SOS) depending on the venue.)

Lamar started the eighth act with an unreleased song nicknamed "Bodies". Mustard returned to the stage for the reprise of "TV Off", and "Not Like Us" closed the set with a transformation from the muted palette of Lamar's performances for the rest of the night into a colorful montage showcasing a variety of black art pieces across time and space, including ancient Egyptian artwork and visuals by funk band Funkadelic. "Luther" and "Gloria" served as the ninth and final act, another duo set, after which they entered the GNX parked atop the stage and descended beneath as the lights dimmed.

== Marketing ==
Grand National Tour concerts included a pop-up store for Not Beauty, a line of lip products launched by SZA in 2025. The line consisted of lip glosses, creams, liners, and stains, which she had made available exclusively on the tour. To further promote the tour, SZA began a series of behind-the-scenes vlogs documenting her experiences with each concert. In each video, she commented on the energy of the concertgoers; showed some interactions with fans; and chronicled some unusual things she had to do because of the tour's demanding nature, like urinating on a bucket. After the second East Rutherford concert, a Not Beauty afterparty DJed by Kaytranada was thrown.

== Critical reception ==
=== Performances ===
One point of praise among reviewers was how Lamar and SZA complemented each other on tour. Many highlighted the contrast between the pair's music, fashion style, and stage visuals. They wrote that despite all of these, the two fostered a harmonious relationship onstage, counterbalancing each other's artistry. Critics like the Dallas Observer's Eric Diep and Stereogum's Tom Breihan said that Lamar and SZA's respective strengths were combined advantageously. the latter wrote that "[y]ou can tell that they both appreciate each other, and maybe that’s partly because they both do things that the other one couldn't." Joey Guerra of the Houston Chronicle summarized the interactions between the duo as a "magnetic push-pull", and Diep called them "twin flames". Lamar and SZA's overlapping sets were the concerts' highlights for many critics because to them, their collaborations were proof of how well they fit together musically.

The duo's stage presence were received positively by many critics. Breihan and Diep wrote that SZA and Lamar's enjoyment of performing to the Dallas crowd was evident. Guerra and Melissa Ruggieri of USA Today drew attention to the two's body language and choreography; they said that these were successful in conveying fierceness and charisma. Ruggieri pointed to the relentlessness with which Lamar rapped "Humble", whereas Guerra cited the "'80s angst" of the "Scorsese Baby Daddy" performance. Guerra and other reviewers like Rolling Stone's Andre Gee and the Los Angeles Times' August Brown wrote positively on how the duo showed their sense of humor. They cited Lamar's references towards the Drake feud, and a video interlude showing SZA's frustration at having her name mispronounced, as examples.

Appraisal towards Lamar's stage presence specifically often focused on his ability to exude intensity and command a loud audience. Various reviewers wrote about how audience members were screaming the lyrics to "TV Off" and the diss tracks about Drake. Consequence reviewer Alex Gonzalez remarked that their shouting "Mustard!" during "TV Off" and "A-minor!" during "Not Like Us" could have caused a small earthquake or broken the sound barrier. Other critics focused on Lamar's vocal delivery and praised the sharpness and crispness of his rapping. In his review for the Chicago Tribune, Bob Gendron praised the "elite command of dynamics, syntax, tone, timing, tension and pitch". Drawing attention to the Drake feud, and the fact that several of the shows were sold out, many critics also dubbed the Grand National Tour a victory lap for Lamar.

Those who complimented SZA's stage presence, like Ruggieri and Gonzalez, mentioned the way she exuded sadness during her balladic songs. Gonzalez said that the pain in her voice was apparent when she performed tracks like "Garden (Say It like Dat)" and praised the moments when she showcased her more eccentric side. For Ruggieri, the highlights of her set were not her ballads but actually the more energetic "Scorsese Baby Daddy" and "F2F". Breihan and Spin's Brendan Hay, who respectively reviewed the Charlotte and Inglewood shows, said that she was visibly enjoying her time onstage and praised her for inspiring positive emotions in her audience. Writing about SZA's departure from the tour for HotNewHipHop, Gabriel Bras Nevares remarked: "don't sleep on [SZA]'s indispensable role in making [the Grand National Tour] such a success and spectacle."

SZA's vocals were praised in multiple reviews for various reasons. Some complimented how she was able to keep the quality of her performances consistent, even through challenges like bad weather, hard choreography, and technical difficulties. Writing for the San Francisco Herald, Todd Inoue complimented the versatility of SZA's sets in terms of what genres were included. Other reviews focused on how melodical her performances were, saying that the vocals were catchy and mellifluous. Guerra said that SZA's voice in the Houston show had "even more color and texture than on her recordings".

=== Production ===
Several critics praised the stage design when talking about the tour production, calling the concerts they reviewed a visual spectacle. Some wrote that the visuals elevated Lamar and SZA's performances, and others said that they succeeded at keeping the audience engaged. A few thought that the stage design punctuated the shows' visual storytelling.

The use of concert visuals during the Grand National Tour was, according to Las Vegas Weekly's Gabriela Rodriguez, "iconic and distinctly Kendrick". Diep cited an example of how he thought stage design was used successfully to present a narrative: "[a] Buick Grand National is packed with horsepower, [for instance,] and you could compare Lamar's stamina behind the mic to his current car of choice." Focusing on the tour's technical aspects was Breihan, who said that the sound system for his venue was effective in preventing the crowd's screaming from overpowering Lamar's performance.

Some reviewers were critical of the tour's nine-act structure, saying that this made the shows feel disjointed and the pacing uneven. A few wrote that Lamar and SZA should have had only one interrupted set each, with a few duets during both. Harrington, one of the reviewers who made the criticism, said that the duo's musical and visual differences further exacerbated the disjointed nature of the concert format: "[it] sabotaged the artists' chances to create any sort of real momentum or continuity during the show." Earl Hopkins, reviewing for The Philadelphia Inquirer, wrote: "with over 50 songs shared between the two artists, most performed in full, there was bound to be a break in the action." In NME, Kyann-Sian Williams said that the visual and sonic whiplash prevented Lamar and SZA from "truly showcasing their brilliance".

Complaints that were raised in discussions of stage production included the lighting; Ruggieri criticized how difficult it was to see Lamar at times despite the multitude of video screens in the U.S. Bank Stadium. In their review of the first London show, Williams said that the synergy between Lamar and SZA was less apparent because their vocals were muffled and "dissipat[ed] through the open roof" of the Tottenham Hotspur Stadium. Another critique, from Ruggieri and Lawrence, was how Lamar's artistic vision did not always translate well in the context of a large stadium concert. The latter wrote: "take Not Like Us and Be Humble off the 50-plus set list, and the 'big numbers' – the ones that get the crowd holding their hearts and swaying and recalling those moments years later – are all SZA's."

== Commercial performance ==
Following the tour's start, SOS and GNX charted at number one and two on the Billboard 200, respectively.

The Grand National Tour's Seattle show broke the record for the highest-grossing hip hop concert. It accumulated $14.811 million from 60,941 tickets sold.

After the Landover concert, the final show in the tour's twenty-three concert North American leg, the tour was declared the highest-grossing co-headlining tour of all time by Billboard, with 1.1 million tickets sold and $256.4 million United States dollars in revenue.

The tour became the biggest and highest-earning by a rapper in history, breaking records along the way, making an estimated total of $390.7 million in revenue, from a total of 2.037 million tickets sold during the 47 concert shows.

== Set list ==
This is the set list from the show in Minneapolis on April 19, 2025. It is not representative of all concerts for the duration of the tour.

Kendrick Lamar

1. "Wacced Out Murals"
2. "Squabble Up"
3. "King Kunta"
4. "Element"
5. "TV Off" (first instrumental)

SZA

6. "30 for 30" (with Kendrick Lamar)
7. "Love Galore"
8. "Broken Clocks"
9. "The Weekend" (includes elements of "Set the Mood (Prelude)" by Justin Timberlake)

Kendrick Lamar

10. "Euphoria"
11. "Hey Now"
12. "Reincarnated"
13. "Humble"
14. "Backseat Freestyle"
15. "Family Ties" (first instrumental) (freestyle)
16. "Swimming Pools (Drank)" (a cappella)
17. "M.A.A.D City" (includes elements of "Sweet Love" by Anita Baker)
18. "Alright"
19. "Man at the Garden"

SZA

20. "Scorsese Baby Daddy"
21. "F2F"
22. "Garden (Say It Like Dat)"
23. "Kitchen"
24. "Blind"
25. "Forgiveless"
26. "Low"

Kendrick Lamar and SZA

27. "Doves in the Wind"
28. "All the Stars"
29. "Love"

Kendrick Lamar

30. "Dodger Blue"
31. "Peekaboo"
32. "Like That" (includes elements of "Caught Up in the Rapture" by Anita Baker)
33. "DNA"
34. "Good Credit"
35. "Count Me Out" (includes elements of "Bitch, Don't Kill My Vibe")
36. "Money Trees"
37. "Poetic Justice"

SZA

38. "Diamond Boy (DTM)" (includes elements of "Who Can I Run To" by the Jones Girls)
39. "Shirt"
40. "Kill Bill"
41. "Snooze"
42. "Crybaby"
43. "Saturn"
44. "Good Days"
45. "Rich Baby Daddy"
46. "BMF"
47. "Kiss Me More" (includes elements of "Kiss" by Prince)

Kendrick Lamar

48. "Bodies" (Note: Fan-given name for the officially untitled snippet, which was originally teased in promotion of GNX.)
49. "TV Off" (with Mustard) (second instrumental) (includes elements of "Angel" by Anita Baker)
50. "Not Like Us"

Kendrick Lamar and SZA

51. "Luther"
52. "Gloria"

=== Set list additions ===
The tour's set list is flexible. The following are the first times every additional song not listed above was performed:

- At the Houston concert, SZA performed "I Hate U".
- At the Atlanta concert, Lamar performed "N95"; SZA performed "Nobody Gets Me" and "What Do I Do".
- At the first East Rutherford concert, SZA performed "Consideration" and "Another Life".
- At the Glendale concert, SZA performed "Open Arms".
- At the St. Louis concert, SZA performed "Go Gina".
- At the second Toronto concert, SZA performed "Drew Barrymore".
- At the Hershey concert, SZA performed "Drive".
- At the Landover concert, SZA performed "20 Something".
- At the Mexico City concert, Lamar performed "Rich Spirit".

=== Guest performers ===
- At the Atlanta concert, Lamar and Playboi Carti performed "Good Credit".
- At the second East Rutherford concert, Lamar and Baby Keem performed "Family Ties".
- At the second East Rutherford concert, SZA and Kaytranada performed "Be Your Girl". (Note: A remix of the Teedra Moses song.)
- At the first Inglewood concert, SZA and Lizzo performed "Special".
- At the second Inglewood concert, SZA and Justin Bieber performed "Snooze".
- At the final Inglewood concert, Lamar and AZ Chike performed "Peekaboo".
- At the Paradise concert, SZA and Doja Cat performed "Kiss Me More".
- At the second Nanterre concert, SZA and Lizzo performed "IRL".
- At the final Sydney concert, Lamar and Schoolboy Q performed “Collard Greens”

== Tour dates ==
List of 2025 concerts
Date (2025)	City	Country	Venue	Supporting act	Attendance	Revenue
April 19	Minneapolis	United States	U.S. Bank Stadium	Mustard	47,354 / 47,354	$9,124,989
April 23	Houston	United States	NRG Stadium	Mustard	42,205 / 45,236	$9,449,459
April 26	Arlington	United States	AT&T Stadium	—N/a (Note: Mustard was unavailable due to a prior engagement.)	—	—
April 29	Atlanta	United States	Mercedes-Benz Stadium	Mustard	—	—
May 3	Charlotte	United States	Bank of America Stadium	Mustard	—	—
May 5	Philadelphia	United States	Lincoln Financial Field	Mustard	—	—
May 8	East Rutherford	United States	MetLife Stadium	Mustard	107,466 / 107,466	$24,759,838
May 9	East Rutherford	United States	MetLife Stadium	Mustard	107,466 / 107,466	$24,759,838
May 12	Foxborough	United States	Gillette Stadium	Mustard	—	—
May 17	Seattle	United States	Lumen Field	Mustard	60,941 / 60,941	$14,811,000
May 21	Inglewood	United States	SoFi Stadium	Mustard	147,283 / 147,283	$40,362,906
May 23	Inglewood	United States	SoFi Stadium	Mustard	147,283 / 147,283	$40,362,906
May 24	Inglewood	United States	SoFi Stadium	Mustard	147,283 / 147,283	$40,362,906
May 27	Glendale	United States	State Farm Stadium	Mustard	—	—
May 29	San Francisco	United States	Oracle Park	Mustard	—	—
May 31	Paradise (Note: Labeled as Las Vegas in promotional material.)	United States	Allegiant Stadium	Mustard	—	—
June 4	St. Louis	United States	The Dome at America's Center	Mustard	48,600/ 48,600	$8,800,000
June 6	Chicago	United States	Soldier Field	Mustard	49,900 / 49,900	$13,200,000
June 10	Detroit	United States	Ford Field	Mustard	47,900 / 47,900	$10,600,000
June 12	Toronto	Canada	Rogers Centre	Mustard	72,041 / 72,041	$15,355,439
June 13	Toronto	Canada	Rogers Centre	Mustard	72,041 / 72,041	$15,355,439
June 16	Hershey	United States	Hersheypark Stadium	Mustard	—	—
June 18	Landover (Note: Labeled as Washington, D.C. in promotional material.)	United States	Northwest Stadium	Mustard	—	—
July 2	Cologne	Germany	RheinEnergieStadion	Mustard	—	—
July 4	Frankfurt	Germany	Deutsche Bank Park	Mustard	—	—
July 5	Frankfurt	Germany	Deutsche Bank Park	Mustard	—	—
July 8	Glasgow	Scotland	Hampden Park	Mustard	—	—
July 10	Birmingham	England	Villa Park	Mustard	—	—
July 13	Amsterdam	Netherlands	Johan Cruyff Arena	Mustard	—	—
July 15	Nanterre	France	Paris La Défense Arena	Mustard	—	—
July 16	Nanterre	France	Paris La Défense Arena	Mustard	—	—
July 19	Cardiff	Wales	Principality Stadium	Mustard	—	—
July 22	London	England	Tottenham Hotspur Stadium	Mustard	—	—
July 23	London	England	Tottenham Hotspur Stadium	Mustard	—	—
July 27	Lisbon	Portugal	Estádio do Restelo	Mustard	—	—
July 30	Barcelona	Spain	Estadi Olímpic Lluís Companys	Mustard	—	—
August 2	Rome	Italy	Stadio Olimpico	Mustard	—	—
August 6	Warsaw	Poland	PGE Narodowy	Mustard	—	—
August 9	Stockholm	Sweden	3Arena	Mustard	—	—
September 23 (Note: Kendrick Lamar was the sole headliner of this show; SZA did not appear.)	Mexico City	Mexico	Estadio GNP Seguros	Ca7riel & Paco Amoroso	—	—
September 30	São Paulo	Brazil	Allianz Parque	Ca7riel & Paco Amoroso	—	—
October 4	Buenos Aires	Argentina	Estadio River Plate	Ca7riel & Paco Amoroso	—	—
October 7	Macul (Note: Labeled as Santiago in promotional material.)	Chile	Estadio Monumental David Arellano	Ca7riel & Paco Amoroso	—	—
December 3	Melbourne	Australia	AAMI Park	Schoolboy Q	—	—
December 4	Melbourne	Australia	AAMI Park	Doechii	—	—
December 10	Sydney	Australia	Allianz Stadium	Schoolboy Q	—	—
December 11	Sydney	Australia	Allianz Stadium	Doechii	—	—
Total					1,100,000	$256,400,000

== Canceled shows ==
List of canceled shows
Planned date (2025)	City	Country	Venue	Planned supporting act	Reason
September 27	Bogotá	Colombia	Vive Claro	Ca7riel & Paco Amoroso	Logistical issues
