= List of Billboard Hot 100 top-ten singles in 2024 =

This is a list of singles that charted in the top ten of the Billboard Hot 100, an all-genre singles chart in the United States, in 2024.

== Top-ten singles ==
Key

- ↑ – indicates single's top 10 entry was also its Hot 100 debut
- † – indicates Best performing song of the year
- (#) – 2024 Year-end top 10 single position and rank
- The "weeks in top ten" column reflects each song's entire chart life, not just its run during 2024.

List of Billboard Hot 100 top ten singles that peaked in 2024
Top ten entry date	Single	Artist(s)	Peak	Peak date	Weeks in top ten	Ref.
Singles from 2023
November 25	"Greedy"^{[A]}	Tate McRae	3	January 13	15	
December 2	"Water"^{[A]}	Tyla	7	January 13	3	
Singles from 2024
January 13	"Agora Hills"^{[B]}^{[D]}^{[E]}	Doja Cat	7	February 3	7	
January 20	"Lose Control"^{[K]} † (#1)	Teddy Swims	1	March 30	80	
January 27	"Yes, And?"^{[F]} ↑	Ariana Grande	1	January 27	3	
January 27	"Redrum" ↑	21 Savage	5	January 27	3	
January 27	"Née-Nah" ↑	21 Savage, Travis Scott and Metro Boomin	10	January 27	1	
February 10	"Hiss" ↑	Megan Thee Stallion	1	February 10	1	
February 10	"Beautiful Things"^{[K]}^{[M]}^{[Q]}^{[R]} (#3)	Benson Boone	2	March 30	42	
February 24	"Texas Hold 'Em"^{[H]} ↑	Beyoncé	1	March 2	9	
February 24	"Carnival" ↑	¥$: Ye and Ty Dolla Sign featuring Rich the Kid and Playboi Carti	1	March 16	6	
February 24	"Stick Season"^{[I]}	Noah Kahan	9	April 27	3	
March 9	"Saturn"^{[J]} ↑	SZA	6	March 9	2	
March 23	"We Can't Be Friends (Wait for Your Love)" ↑	Ariana Grande	1	March 23	6	
March 23	"Act II: Date @ 8"	4Batz featuring Drake	7	March 23	1	
March 30	"Enough (Miami)" ↑	Cardi B	9	March 30	1	
April 6	"Like That"^{[K]} ↑	Future, Metro Boomin and Kendrick Lamar	1	April 6	7	
April 6	"Type Shit" ↑	Future, Metro Boomin, Travis Scott and Playboi Carti	2	April 6	3	
April 6	"Too Sweet"^{[K]}^{[L]} ↑ (#10)	Hozier	1	April 27	19	
April 6	"Cinderella" ↑	Future, Metro Boomin and Travis Scott	6	April 6	1	
April 6	"We Don't Trust You" ↑	Future and Metro Boomin	8	April 6	1	
April 6	"Young Metro" ↑	Future, Metro Boomin and The Weeknd	9	April 6	1	
April 13	"II Most Wanted" ↑	Beyoncé and Miley Cyrus	6	April 13	1	
April 13	"Jolene" ↑	Beyoncé	7	April 13	1	
April 20	"7 Minute Drill" ↑	J. Cole	6	April 20	1	
April 27	"Espresso"^{[K]} ↑ (#7)	Sabrina Carpenter	3	June 22	33	
May 4	"Fortnight" ↑	Taylor Swift featuring Post Malone	1	May 4	5	
May 4	"Down Bad" ↑	Taylor Swift	2	May 4	2	
May 4	"I Can Do It with a Broken Heart" ↑	Taylor Swift	3	May 4	2	
May 4	"The Tortured Poets Department" ↑	Taylor Swift	4	May 4	1	
May 4	"So Long, London" ↑	Taylor Swift	5	May 4	1	
May 4	"My Boy Only Breaks His Favorite Toys" ↑	Taylor Swift	6	May 4	1	
May 4	"But Daddy I Love Him" ↑	Taylor Swift	7	May 4	1	
May 4	"Florida!!!" ↑	Taylor Swift featuring Florence + the Machine	8	May 4	1	
May 4	"Who's Afraid of Little Old Me?" ↑	Taylor Swift	9	May 4	1	
May 4	"Guilty as Sin?" ↑	Taylor Swift	10	May 4	1	
May 11	"Million Dollar Baby" ↑ (#8)	Tommy Richman	2	May 11	17	
May 11	"A Bar Song (Tipsy)" (#2)	Shaboozey	1	July 13	66	
May 18	"Not Like Us" ↑ (#6)	Kendrick Lamar	1	May 18	28	
May 18	"Euphoria"	Kendrick Lamar	3	May 18	1	
May 18	"Family Matters" ↑	Drake	7	May 18	1	
May 25	"I Had Some Help" ↑ (#4)	Post Malone featuring Morgan Wallen	1	May 25	30	
June 1	"Lunch" ↑	Billie Eilish	5	June 1	2	
June 8	"Pink Skies" ↑	Zach Bryan	6	June 8	2	
June 15	"Houdini"^{[N]} ↑	Eminem	2	June 15	3	
June 22	"Please Please Please" ↑	Sabrina Carpenter	1	June 29	19	
June 22	"Birds of a Feather"^{[P]}	Billie Eilish	2	October 12	33	
July 13	"Good Luck, Babe!"^{[O]}	Chappell Roan	4	September 28	14	
July 20	"Lies Lies Lies" ↑	Morgan Wallen	7	July 20	1	
September 7	"Taste" ↑	Sabrina Carpenter	2	September 7	14	
October 12	"Timeless" ↑	The Weeknd and Playboi Carti	3	October 12	2	
November 2	"Love Somebody" ↑	Morgan Wallen	1	November 2	8	
November 9	"St. Chroma" ↑	Tyler, the Creator featuring Daniel Caesar	7	November 9	1	
November 9	"Noid"	Tyler, the Creator	10	November 9	1	
November 16	"Sticky"	Tyler, the Creator featuring GloRilla, Sexyy Red and Lil Wayne	10	November 16	1	
November 23	"That's So True"	Gracie Abrams	6	November 23	7	
December 7	"Squabble Up" ↑	Kendrick Lamar	1	December 7	6	
December 7	"TV Off" ↑	Kendrick Lamar featuring Lefty Gunplay	2	December 7	9	
December 7	"Wacced Out Murals" ↑	Kendrick Lamar	4	December 7	1	
December 7	"Hey Now" ↑	Kendrick Lamar featuring Dody6	5	December 7	1	
December 7	"Reincarnated" ↑	Kendrick Lamar	8	December 7	1	
December 7	"Man at the Garden" ↑	Kendrick Lamar	9	December 7	1	

=== 2023 peaks ===
List of Billboard Hot 100 top ten singles in 2024 that peaked in 2023
Top ten entry date	Single	Artist(s)	Peak	Peak date	Weeks in top ten	Ref.
January 28	"Flowers"^{[C]} ↑	Miley Cyrus	1	January 28	29	
February 18	"Last Night"^{[A]}	Morgan Wallen	1	March 18	41	
May 27	"Fast Car"^{[A]}^{[C]}	Luke Combs	2	July 1	27	
July 15	"Cruel Summer"^{[A]}^{[G]}	Taylor Swift	1	October 28	34	
August 19	"Snooze"^{[A]}	SZA	2	October 7	26	
September 2	"Paint the Town Red"^{[A]}	Doja Cat	1	September 16	20	
September 9	"I Remember Everything"^{[A]} ↑ (#9)	Zach Bryan featuring Kacey Musgraves	1	September 9	23	
November 25	"Lovin on Me" ↑ (#5)	Jack Harlow	1	December 2	23	

=== 2025 peaks ===
List of Billboard Hot 100 top ten singles in 2024 that peaked in 2025
Top ten entry date	Single	Artist(s)	Peak	Peak date	Weeks in top ten	Ref.
August 31	"Die with a Smile" ↑	Lady Gaga and Bruno Mars	1	January 11	51	
November 2	"APT." ↑	Rosé and Bruno Mars	3	February 1	14	
December 7	"Luther" ↑	Kendrick Lamar and SZA	1	March 1	32	

=== Holiday season ===
Holiday titles first making the Billboard Hot 100 top ten during the 2024–25 holiday season
Top ten entry date	Single	Artist(s)	Peak	Peak date	Weeks in top ten	Ref.
December 28, 2024	"Santa Tell Me"	Ariana Grande	5	January 4, 2025	6	
December 28, 2024	"Underneath the Tree"	Kelly Clarkson	7	December 27, 2025	5	

Recurring holiday titles, appearing in the Billboard Hot 100 top ten in previous holiday seasons
Top ten entry date	Single	Artist(s)	Peak	Peak date	Weeks in top ten	Ref.
December 30, 2017	"All I Want for Christmas Is You"^{[S]}	Mariah Carey	1	December 21, 2019	43	
December 29, 2018	"It's the Most Wonderful Time of the Year"^{[U]}	Andy Williams	5	January 2, 2021	24	
January 5, 2019	"Rockin' Around the Christmas Tree"^{[T]}	Brenda Lee	1	December 9, 2023	35	
January 5, 2019	"Jingle Bell Rock"^{[T]}	Bobby Helms	2	December 27, 2025	32	
January 5, 2019	"A Holly Jolly Christmas"^{[T]}	Burl Ives	4	January 4, 2020	26	
January 2, 2021	"Let It Snow, Let It Snow, Let It Snow"^{[U]}	Dean Martin	7	January 6, 2024	8	
January 2, 2021	"Last Christmas"^{[T]}	Wham!	2	December 13, 2025	22	

=== Notes ===
^{A} The single re-entered the top ten on the week ending January 13, 2024.
^{B} The single re-entered the top ten on the week ending February 3, 2024.
^{C} The single re-entered the top ten on the week ending February 17, 2024.
^{D} The single re-entered the top ten on the week ending March 2, 2024.
^{E} The single re-entered the top ten on the week ending March 16, 2024.
^{F} The single re-entered the top ten on the week ending March 23, 2024.
^{G} The single re-entered the top ten on the week ending March 30, 2024.
^{H} The single re-entered the top ten on the week ending April 13, 2024.
^{I} The single re-entered the top ten on the week ending April 20, 2024.
^{J} The single re-entered the top ten on the week ending April 27, 2024.
^{K} The single re-entered the top ten on the week ending May 11, 2024.
^{L} The single re-entered the top ten on the week ending May 25, 2024.
^{M} The single re-entered the top ten on the week ending June 29, 2024.
^{N} The single re-entered the top ten on the week ending July 27, 2024.
^{O} The single re-entered the top ten on the week ending August 3, 2024.
^{P} The single re-entered the top ten on the week ending August 10, 2024.
^{Q} The single re-entered the top ten on the week ending October 19, 2024.
^{R} The single re-entered the top ten on the week ending November 16, 2024.
^{S} The single re-entered the top ten on the week ending December 7, 2024.
^{T} The single re-entered the top ten on the week ending December 14, 2024.
^{U} The single re-entered the top ten on the week ending December 28, 2024.

== Artists with most top-ten songs ==
List of artists by total songs charting in the top-ten this year
Artist	Numbers of songs
Taylor Swift	11
Kendrick Lamar	10
Metro Boomin	6
Future	5
Morgan Wallen	4
Beyoncé	3
Travis Scott	3
Sabrina Carpenter	3
Playboi Carti	3
Tyler, the Creator	3
SZA	3
Ariana Grande	3
Drake	2
Doja Cat	2
Miley Cyrus	2
21 Savage	2
Post Malone	2
Zach Bryan	2
Billie Eilish	2
The Weeknd	2
Bruno Mars	2

== See also ==
- 2024 in American music
- List of Billboard Hot 100 number ones of 2024
