= GNX (song) =

2024 song by Kendrick Lamar featuring Hitta J3, YoungThreat, and Peysoh

Song by Kendrick Lamar featuring Hitta J3, YoungThreat, and Peysoh

from the album GNX
- Released: November 22, 2024
- Genre: Hip-hop
- Length: 3:13
- Label: PGLang; Interscope
- Songwriters: Kendrick Duckworth; Dominicke Williams; Deonta Simuel; Kevin Oropeza; Mark Spears; Jack Antonoff; Kenneth Gnanasundaram; Billy Gnanasundaram; Tobias Breuer
- Producers: Sounwave; Antonoff; Kenny & Billy; Rascal; Tim Maxey (add.)

GNX track listing
- 12 tracks: 1. "Wacced Out Murals"; 2. "Squabble Up"; 3. "Luther"; 4. "Man at the Garden"; 5. "Hey Now"; 6. "Reincarnated"; 7. "TV Off"; 8. "Dodger Blue"; 9. "Peekaboo"; 10. "Heart Pt. 6"; 11. "GNX"; 12. "Gloria"

"GNX" (stylized in all lowercase) is a song by the American rapper Kendrick Lamar from his album GNX (2024). It features the American rappers Hitta J3, YoungThreat, and Peysoh. The song was produced by Sounwave, Jack Antonoff, Kenny & Billy and Tobias "Rascal" Breuer, with additional production from Tim Maxey.

== Background ==
Rascal revealed that Kendrick Lamar had received the beat for "GNX" from him only two days prior to its release. He had given the beat to Lamar after the rapper requested "some ignorant west shit" in an Instagram text message.

== Composition ==
The production contains a piano figure of four notes, along with snares, kicks and hi-hats. The song consists of three verses, each rapped by one of the featured rappers. Kendrick Lamar performs only on the chorus, in which he shouts out to the rapper performing (with lines including "Who put the west back in front of shit?" and "Tell 'em [rapper] did it") as he joins them. Peysoh, Hitta J3 and YoungThreat deliver verses with boasting and gun-related lyrics.

== Critical reception ==
Alexis Petridis of The Guardian had a favorable reaction to the "kind of abstraction" found on the song's "itchy, fidgety backing and old-fashioned 80s Latin freestyle". Kyann-Sian Williams of NME described the song as "a menacing and grimy tune dedicated to those whose urge to stand on business is unwavering", while Clash's Karl Blakesley called it a "dominant rap muscle-flex". Dakota West Foss of Sputnikmusic remarked "The song's refrain, 'I'm trippin' and I'm lovin' it,' might be the best elevator pitch for the project's existence. You can practically hear Kendrick struggle to not break out into laughter when he utters those words in some absurd accent that sounds like a revival of one of the dozen or so characters he embodied in 'Family Ties,' and you can tell he's having the time of his life getting whacky with it. It's an obnoxious song that will likely filter a lot of people with its off-kilter piano, and an even odder choice to make the ostensible flagplant of the album. You either 'get' it or don't, and I happen to love it." Ben Devlin of MusicOMH regarded YoungThreat's performance to be a highlight, writing "his low-key flow coming through after a second or two of silence with the already minimal beat stripped down still further, and Kendrick performs an engaging hook with comic vocal inflections." AllMusic's David Crone called the song a "staggering rekindling of the 'King Kunta' flame". Billboard's Michael Saponara placed the song at number 9 in his ranking of the songs from GNX. Matthew Kim of The Line of Best Fit gave a negative review, commenting "The track itself is comparatively weak, mostly due to an upsettingly wonky instrumental that falls over itself for three whole minutes. Each of the featured artists deserved way better – they rap in top form, as does every feature on this album, even when they only get a few bars."

== Charts ==
Chart performance for "GNX"
Chart (2024)	Peak position
Australia (ARIA)	72
Australia Hip Hop/R&B (ARIA)	15
Canada Hot 100 (Billboard)	49
Global 200 (Billboard)	35
Lithuania (AGATA)	57
New Zealand (Recorded Music NZ)	36
South Africa (Billboard)	22
Sweden Heatseeker (Sverigetopplistan)	14
US Billboard Hot 100	24
US Hot R&B/Hip-Hop Songs (Billboard)	11
