= Count Me Out (Kendrick Lamar song) =

Song by Kendrick Lamar

from the album Mr. Morale and the Big Steppers
- Recorded: 2022
- Genre: Conscious hip hop
- Length: 4:44
- Label: Top Dawg; Aftermath; Interscope
- Songwriters: Kendrick Duckworth; Mark Spears; DJ Dahi
- Producers: Sounwave; Tim Maxey; J.lbs

Music video
- "Count Me Out" on YouTube

"Count Me Out" is a song by American rapper Kendrick Lamar, from his fifth studio album Mr. Morale & the Big Steppers, released on May 13, 2022. The tenth track on the album (and the first on 'Disc 2'), the song was produced by Sounwave, DJ Dahi, Tim Maxey and J.lbs.

== Lyrics ==
The song begins with an intro sung by Sam Dew:

"We May Not Know Which Way to go on this dark road
All of these hoes make it difficult"
(sung in an identical melody to the opening of United In Grief, the first song on Disc 1).

The song covers themes of regret, infidelity, self-forgiveness, redemption, and determination. The opening verse can be interpreted as a therapeutic confession. The song's tempo moves from slows in the first verse, to more upbeat in the second before gradually slowing down in the final verse.

== Music video ==
The associated music video was released on December 16, 2022, on YouTube and directed by Lamar himself and Dave Free and stars Lamar and Helen Mirren. The video, which includes only the song's first verse, covers a therapy session between Lamar and his therapist (portrayed by Mirren). The video begins with Lamar recounting the story of a humorous parking incident. The therapist recounts a text message she received from Lamar saying "I feel like I'm falling" and asks why he feels that way, to which Lamar responds "Life". Lamar then raps the first verse of "Count Me Out" while the therapist listens, as clips relating to the lyrics he covers appear on screen. After the verse, Kendrick turns around to face his piano while an angel appears next to him.

== Reception ==
Both the song and video have received critical acclaim from fans and critics alike. The song debuted at number 20 on the Billboard Hot 100 The music video received a Grammy Award nomination.

== Performances ==
Lamar performed "Count Me Out" during The Big Steppers Tour. The performance featured a silhouetted version of Kendrick rapping the first verse while hunched over, with arrows lodged into his back. Lamar performed the song with a mashup of "Bitch, Don't Kill My Vibe" during the Grand National Tour.

== Certifications ==
Certifications for "Count Me Out"
Region	Certification	Certified units/sales
Australia (ARIA)	Platinum	70,000^{‡}
New Zealand (RMNZ)	Gold	15,000^{‡}
United Kingdom (BPI)	Silver	200,000^{‡}
^{‡} Sales+streaming figures based on certification alone.
