= F2F (song) =

2022 song by SZA

Song by SZA

from the album SOS
- Released: December 9, 2022
- Genre: Pop rock
- Length: 3:06
- Label: Top Dawg; RCA
- Songwriters: Solána Rowe; Melissa Jefferson; Rob Bisel; Carter Lang
- Producers: Bisel; Lang

Lyric video
- "F2F" on YouTube

"F2F" is a song by American singer-songwriter SZA from her second studio album, SOS (2022). "F2F" is a rock song that draws influence from genres such as country, pop rock, and grunge. SZA wrote the song with Lizzo, who provides background vocals, and producers Rob Bisel and Carter Lang. Lizzo performs whistling vocals on the song. The song was one of around five rock-inspired songs SZA created for SOS, out of a desire to experiment with various genres outside of her usual R&B music. The song begins with acoustic guitar strums before transitioning into a chorus backed by drums and power chords from electric guitars. The lyrics talk about having sex with someone to cope with breaking up with a former partner.

SZA's experimentation with rock on the song was positively received. "F2F" was one of 20 tracks from SOS that debuted on the US Billboard Hot 100. Consequently, it became SZA's first song to debut atop Billboard's Alternative Streaming Songs chart.

== Background ==
The only reason I'm defined as an R&B artist is because I'm Black. It's almost a little reductive because it doesn't allow space to be anything else or try anything else [...] I simply just want to be allowed the same opportunity to make whatever I want without a label, [without it being] based on the color of my skin [...] I want 'F2F' to be seen as what it is.

— SZA, 2024 interview for Dazed

In 2017, SZA released her critically and commercially successful debut studio album, Ctrl. Throughout the years, critics have credited it as being innovative within the R&B genre, and for establishing her as a major figure in contemporary pop and R&B music. (Note: Cited to The Line of Best Fit, NME, The Daily Telegraph, The New Yorker, and Consequence) In Ctrl, SZA spoke variously about romance, desire, and self-esteem, often in a vulnerable tone, as well as the many ways in which emotions like jealousy and intense desire can destroy them.

As SZA gained more recognition, she was consistently being labeled in several publications as an R&B musician. She took notice and was frustrated. In interviews, she often linked the specific categorization to stereotypes about Black women in music, saying that the label implied she was not allowed to make other forms of music. With her next studio album, SOS (2022), she wanted to incorporate a wide mix of genres as she had in Ctrl. Apart from the usual R&B, SZA experimented with rock and punk music; in a Consequence cover story, she remarked: "I love making Black music, period. Something that is just full of energy. Black music doesn't have to just be R&B. We started rock 'n' roll."

== Music and lyrics ==
Commenting on the creative process behind the album, SZA said it would be as candid and personal as Ctrl: "This next album is even more of me being less afraid of who am I when I have no choice? When I'm not out trying to curate myself and contain." When SZA collaborated with Cosmopolitan for their February 2021 issue, she spoke about her creative process behind the album's conception: "this album is going to be the shit that made me feel something in my...here and in here", pointing to her heart and gut.

Originally titled "Charlatan", "F2F" was one of around five rock songs that SZA created for SOS. She explained to Rolling Stone that these songs contained heavily confessional lyrics that demonstrated several versions of herself: "They were all terrible in terms of, like, saying bad things about what I've done to people, but it sounded cool, and I think that's what all those songs are really about. Just being super honest and letting that out." Rob Bisel and Carter Lang, producers of "F2F", revealed that American singer and rapper Lizzo was coincidentally in the same studio as SZA when she recorded the song. They added that it was one out of several songs on which the two collaborated during recording sessions; a few days prior, it was announced that Lizzo would feature on a song from the deluxe edition of SOS titled "BMF".

"F2F"
"F2F" is an eclectic combination of rock and country musical styles, featuring acoustic guitar strums in the first verse and drums and power chords from electric guitars in the chorus.

According to music journalists, "F2F" can be classified as stadium rock, pop rock, pop punk, grunge, and country. The first verse demonstrates its country influences—in it, SZA sings over acoustic guitar strums—after which drums and power chords from electric guitars appear for the chorus to indicate its punk and rock elements. Critics found the song reminiscent of rock music from the late 1990s to the early 2000s, drawing comparisons to artists like Avril Lavigne, Fefe Dobson, Paramore, and Liz Phair.

To create "F2F", SZA freestyled or improvised lyrics over an initial version of the beat with Lizzo, who helped write the song's bridge and provided pitched-up background vocals. She originally had a verse in the song, but it was removed for unspecified reasons. The lyrics discuss having sex with people to cope with a rebound, or a period of time after the end of a romantic relationship.

== Release and reception ==
On December 3, 2022, SZA appeared on Saturday Night Live and announced SOS would be released on December 9. Two days later, she posted the track list on Twitter. Out of 23 songs, "F2F" appears as the album's 13th track.

== Reception ==
After the release of SOS, 20 tracks from the album debuted on the Billboard Hot 100. Among of them was "F2F", which was the 16th highest charting track; it debuted at number 55 and helped increase SZA's total amount of chart entries to 37. It was bolstered by around 13.7 million streams in its first opening week; with these streaming numbers, the song debuted atop Billboard's Alternative Streaming Songs chart, her first number 1 there. Alternative Songs is a component chart of Hot Rock & Alternative Songs, on which "F2F" peaked at number 3.

Many critics considered SZA's genre experimentation with "F2F" a success. Isabella Sarmiento, writing for NPR, picked "F2F" as one of the best songs of 2022.

== Live performances ==
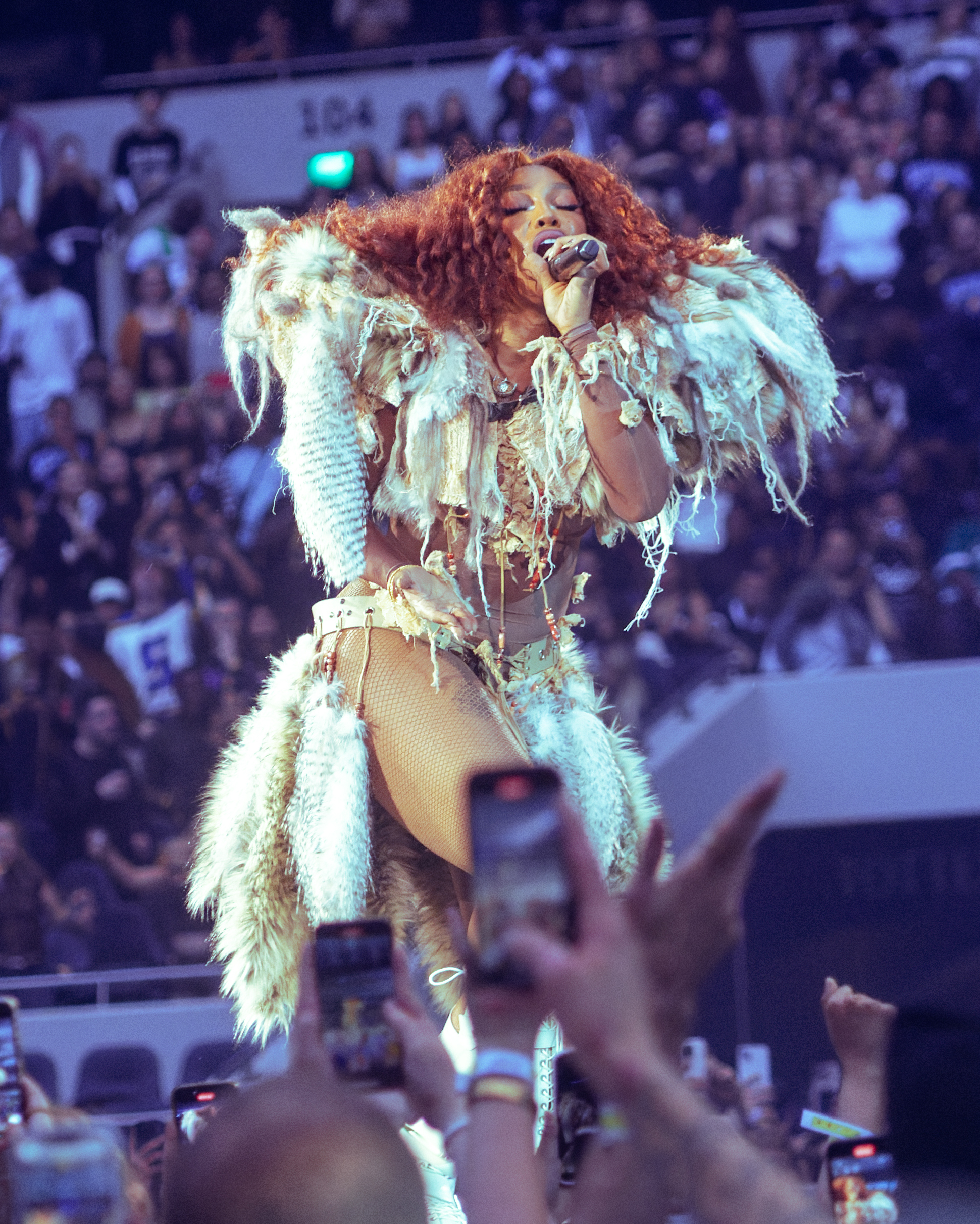
SZA performing "F2F" on the Grand National Tour in London

SZA included "F2F" regularly during her international SOS Tour from 2023 to 2024; while performing, she would headbang onstage with her guitarist. She also had the song on her headlining set for Glastonbury 2024. The following year, SZA went on the co-headlining Grand National Tour (2025) with Kendrick Lamar. Concerts were divided into nine acts; SZA performed the song during the fourth, atop a stage with a forest-themed aesthetic.

== Credits ==
Credits are adapted from the liner notes of SOS.

Recording and management

- Engineered at Conway C and Westlake Barn and C (Los Angeles, California)
- Mixed at Little People Studio (Los Angeles)
- Mastered at Becker Mastering (Pasadena, California)

Personnel

- Solána Rowe (SZA) – lead vocals, songwriting
- Rob Bisel – songwriting, production, guitars, bass, keyboards, engineering
- Carter Lang – songwriting, production, guitars, bass, drums, keyboards
- Melissa Jefferson (Lizzo) (Note: Appears courtesy of Nice Life / Atlantic Recording Corporation) – songwriting, background vocals
- Robert N. Johnson – assistant engineering
- Noah Hashimoto – assistant engineering
- Dana Nielsen – mixing
- Dale Becker – mastering
- Katie Harvey – assistant mastering
- Noah McCorkle – assistant mastering

== Charts ==
=== Weekly charts ===
Weekly chart performance for "F2F"
Chart (2022)	Peak position
Australia (ARIA)	87
Canada Hot 100 (Billboard)	54
Global 200 (Billboard)	69
Portugal (AFP)	182
US Billboard Hot 100	55
US Hot Rock & Alternative Songs (Billboard)	3

=== Year-end charts ===
Year-end chart performance for "F2F"
Chart (2023)	Position
US Hot Rock & Alternative Songs (Billboard)	31

== Certifications ==
Certifications for "F2F"
Region	Certification	Certified units/sales
Canada (Music Canada)	Platinum	80,000^{‡}
New Zealand (RMNZ)	Gold	15,000^{‡}
United States (RIAA)	Platinum	1,000,000^{‡}
^{‡} Sales+streaming figures based on certification alone.
