= Annahstasia =

American soul musician

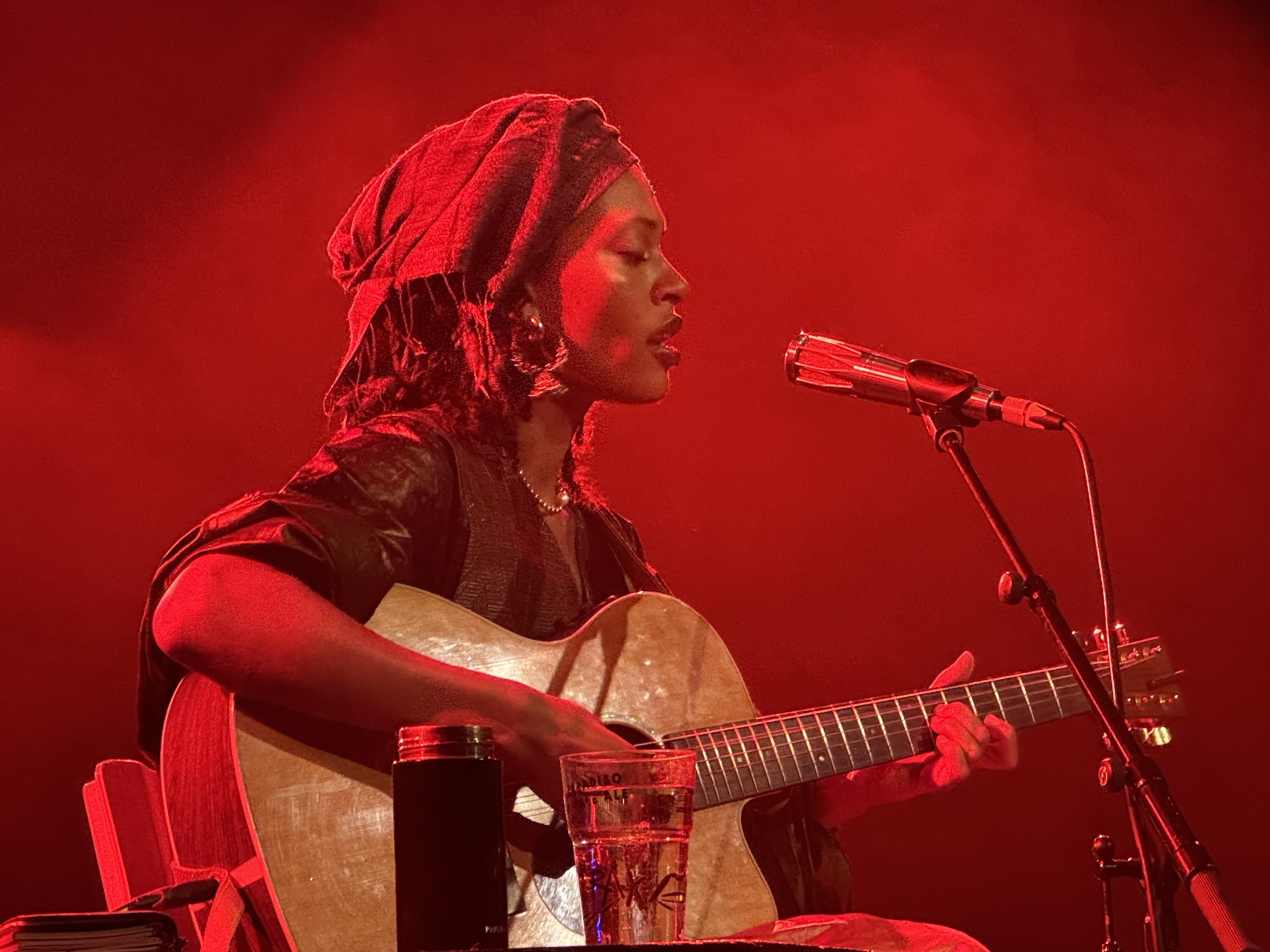
Annahstasia performing at Paradiso Tolhuistuin in Amsterdam, the Netherlands in May 2026

Annahstasia Enuke, known mononymously as Annahstasia, is an American folk musician from Los Angeles.

== History ==
Annahstasia released her debut EP Revival in 2023. Annahstasia released her second EP, Surface Tension, in 2024. Annahstasia released her debut album, Tether, in 2025 to critical acclaim, including the "Best New Music" designation from Pitchfork. Annahstasia released a live album, Live at Glasshaus, in March 2026, featuring 13 renditions of songs from across her catalog. The project was released by Brooklyn-based record label and film production studio Glasshaus and produced by Jarrett Wetherell.

Annahstasia was also featured in the music video for Kendrick Lamar and SZA's song "Luther", portraying Lamar's love interest.

== Discography ==
Studio albums

- Tether (2025)

EPs

- Revival (2023)
- Surface Tension (2024)

Live albums

- Live at Glasshauss (2026)
