= Deyra Barrera =

Mexican mariachi singer

Deyra Barrera (born 1974/1975, Villa Juárez, Sonora, Mexico) is a regional Mexican singer-songwriter and mariachi performer who immigrated to the United States in 1993. With a long history as a mariachi musician, she has performed in national and international singing reality television shows. She was a finalist on the singing show La Reina de la Canción in 2017, and has also appeared on La Voz and La Academia.

Among her musical inspirations are ranchera musicians Amalia Mendoza, Lucha Villa, and Lola Beltrán. She released an album with Regional Mexican artists Carmen Ríos and Verónica Rosales.

Barrera is featured on and co-wrote three tracks on the GNX album by Kendrick Lamar: "Wacced Out Murals", "Reincarnated," and "Gloria". She also performed at the 2024 World Series in tribute to the late Mexican baseball player and her personal friend, Fernando Valenzuela, which is how Lamar first heard her.
