= Super Bowl LIX halftime show =

Event during the 2025 Super Bowl

- Part of: Super Bowl LIX
- Date: February 9, 2025
- Location: New Orleans, Louisiana, U.S.
- Venue: Caesars Superdome
- Headliner: Kendrick Lamar
- Special guests: SZA; Samuel L. Jackson; Serena Williams; Mustard
- Sponsor: Apple Music
- Director: Hamish Hamilton
- Producer: Jesse Collins; Roc Nation; PGLang

Super Bowl halftime show chronology
LVIII (2024)	LIX (2025)	LX (2026)
Kendrick Lamar concert chronology
The Pop Out: Ken & Friends (2024)	Super Bowl LIX halftime show (2025)	Grand National Tour (2025)

The Super Bowl LIX halftime show, officially known as the Apple Music Super Bowl LIX Halftime Show for sponsorship reasons, was the halftime entertainment of Super Bowl LIX, which took place on February 9, 2025, at the Caesars Superdome in New Orleans, Louisiana. It featured rapper Kendrick Lamar as the headline performer, with guest appearances from singer-songwriter SZA, actor Samuel L. Jackson, tennis player Serena Williams, and record producer Mustard.

On September 8, 2024, the NFL and Apple Music announced its selection of Kendrick Lamar to headline the event, which subsequently received a polarized response. Several major industry rappers criticized the selection, claiming it was a snub against New Orleans native Lil Wayne. Critics mostly praised the selection, saying it was a full-circle moment following Lamar's feud with Drake. Prior to the show, speculation arose over if Lamar would incorporate "Not Like Us" into his performance, following FCC and legal concerns.

The show was televised nationally in the U.S. by Fox and Fox Deportes, with streaming available via Tubi and NFL+. The performance was seen by a combined 133.5 million viewers domestically across all platforms, surpassing Michael Jackson's performance at Super Bowl XXVII in 1993 as the most viewed halftime show in the United States. The show received widespread acclaim, with particular praise for Lamar's performance, its production, tone, and themes. It sparked numerous analyses regarding its social commentary on civil rights in the United States.

== Background ==
=== Selection process ===
The process of deciding a headline performer for the Super Bowl halftime show is disputed. According to The Charlotte Observer, it begins with a panel that includes the National Football League's (NFL) director of entertainment, members of its production company, and the halftime show's director and producer. A short list of potential performers is created and given to the Super Bowl's host city, who makes the final decision. However, members of its host committee claimed that a headline performer is solely picked by the league, and they are notified on who was chosen in the same manner as the general public.

On August 13, 2019, the NFL announced a partnership with Shawn "Jay-Z" Carter and his entertainment company Roc Nation to be named the league's live music entertainment strategist. In that role, Jay-Z and his firm, led by Roc Nation CEO and co-founder Desiree Perez, became co-producers and consultants of the Super Bowl halftime show. This allowed them to be involved in selecting music for NFL usage and choosing entertainers to perform in televised promotional spots throughout the season. "We really wanted to start to focus on leading to culture," Seth Dudowsky, the league's head of music, explained. "Whether that's the culture of the city, what's happening in culture at large and then focusing on it so that what we're doing feels culturally relevant and using that platform for artists to be able to be themselves and show their art on stage. We want them to feel empowered."

Kendrick Lamar previously headlined the Super Bowl LVI halftime show alongside Dr. Dre, Snoop Dogg, Eminem, and Mary J. Blige, with 50 Cent and Anderson .Paak serving as special guests. The first halftime show to be centered entirely around hip hop music, it was met with critical acclaim and garnered three Primetime Emmy Awards, including a historic win for Outstanding Variety Special (Live). Perez became the first executive producer to win in that category. Lamar's "thrilling" and "electrifying" performance was highlighted by several critics. Jon Caramanica of The New York Times called it "stunning—ecstatically liquid in flow, moving his body with jagged vigor." Rolling Stone's Rob Sheffield opined that he deserved an entire slot to himself.

=== Artists in contention ===
Lil Wayne publicly campaigned to headline a Super Bowl halftime show, especially one hosted in his hometown of New Orleans. He was an initial candidate to perform, according to Stephen A. Smith for ESPN. "I'd kill that shit," Wayne exclaimed in an interview with Rolling Stone's Andre Gee. "We wouldn't even worry about the game after that. Everybody knew that one kid [who] was watching the halftime show, but that'd be one of the first Super Bowls that they'll be like, 'Both teams were out on the field watching the halftime show.'" By February 2024, Wayne was not given the call from the NFL, but he remained hopeful about his chances. "We all praying, we keeping our fingers crossed," he told YG. "I'm working hard. I'm going to make sure this next album and everything I do is killer, so I want to just make it hard for them not to highlight the boy."

During the summer of 2024, Miley Cyrus was also rumored to be performing at the halftime show.

== Headliner announcement ==
Rap music is still the most impactful genre to date. And I'll be there to remind the world why. They got the right one.

— Lamar on headlining the Super Bowl LIX halftime show, The Hollywood Reporter

On September 8, 2024, before the first full slate of regular season matches went underway, the NFL, Apple Music and Roc Nation announced Lamar as the headlining act for the Super Bowl LIX halftime show. He is the first rapper to lead the festivities multiple times.

Lamar shared the news by posting a promotional trailer on YouTube, which was directed by his long-time creative partner Dave Free. The one-shot trailer shows him on a football field in front of a large American flag throwing footballs through a passing machine at off-screen players. As he shouts motivational remarks to them, he introduces himself as the headliner. On January 23, 2025, it was announced that SZA would be joining as a special guest.

In the video announcing his selection, Lamar said "You know it's only one opportunity to win a championship. No round twos", which was interpreted as a shot against Drake, who posted a few weeks before that "we will win Game 2". Speculation arose as to whether he would incorporate "Not Like Us" into his performance.

=== Reception to selection ===
The decision to have Lamar headline the halftime show polarized the rap industry. Media outlets described Lil Wayne not being chosen as the headliner as a snub, given the event was taking place in his hometown, and he admitted the announcement "broke" him. Members of his record label—Young Money Entertainment—Birdman and Nicki Minaj, Louisiana rappers Boosie Badazz and Master P, and East Coast hip-hop artists Cam'ron and Mase condemned Jay-Z for the "egregious" selection and accused him of factoring in his complicated relationship with Lil Wayne and other artists under his label. On the other hand, Charlamagne tha God, Fabolous, Fat Joe, and Jay Electronica defended Jay-Z, noting that he was not the only one involved in deciding the headliner.

Critics were more positive about Lamar's announcement, praising it as a historic and full circle accomplishment that ties to the beginning of his escalated feud with Drake. The editorial staff of HipHopDX, led by Elliott Wilson, opined that he was the right choice, citing his legacy, catalog, and showmanship as prime examples. Justin Sayles of The Ringer stated his belief that the halftime performance announcement was the capstone of a year that had seen Lamar "ascend to the highest levels" of popular culture, and seen Drake "sink to the lowest levels" of his career. David Dennis Jr. of Andscape declared the announcement as a final, definitive reminder that Lamar has completed "one of the most undeniable one-sided victories in rap history." USA Today's Mike Freeman argued that it showcased a prominent example of Jay-Z's influence on the NFL's mostly conservative owners by "unabashedly injecting Black culture into the league's Super Bowl bloodstream." However, some commentators found it hypocritical of Lamar to headline the performance given his reputation as a socially aware rapper and the NFL's troubled history with social justice initiatives.

On November 22, 2024, Lamar released his sixth studio album, GNX. In the song "Wacced Out Murals", he mentions Lil Wayne's reaction towards his Super Bowl announcement. He says his hard work let Lil Wayne down, and that Nas was the only rap artist to praise him for it.

== Development ==
Creative direction for the performance was provided by Lamar and Free's company, PGLang. It was produced by Diversified Production Services (DPS) and directed by Hamish Hamilton. Jesse Collins, Jay-Z and Roc Nation executive produced the telecast for a sixth year; the latter agency also served as strategic entertainment advisors.

== Performance synopsis ==
"Super Bowl LIX Halftime Show" (live)

Promotional single by Kendrick Lamar

from the album Super Bowl LIX Live from New Orleans, LA
- Released: February 11, 2025
- Recorded: February 9, 2025
- Venue: Caesars Superdome
- Length: 13:20
- Label: NFL
- Songwriter: Kendrick Lamar

Kendrick Lamar promotional singles chronology
"The Heart Part 5" (2022)	"Super Bowl LIX Halftime Show" (live) (2025)	"Chains & Whips" (2025)

Performance video
- Kendrick Lamar's Apple Music Super Bowl Halftime Show on YouTube

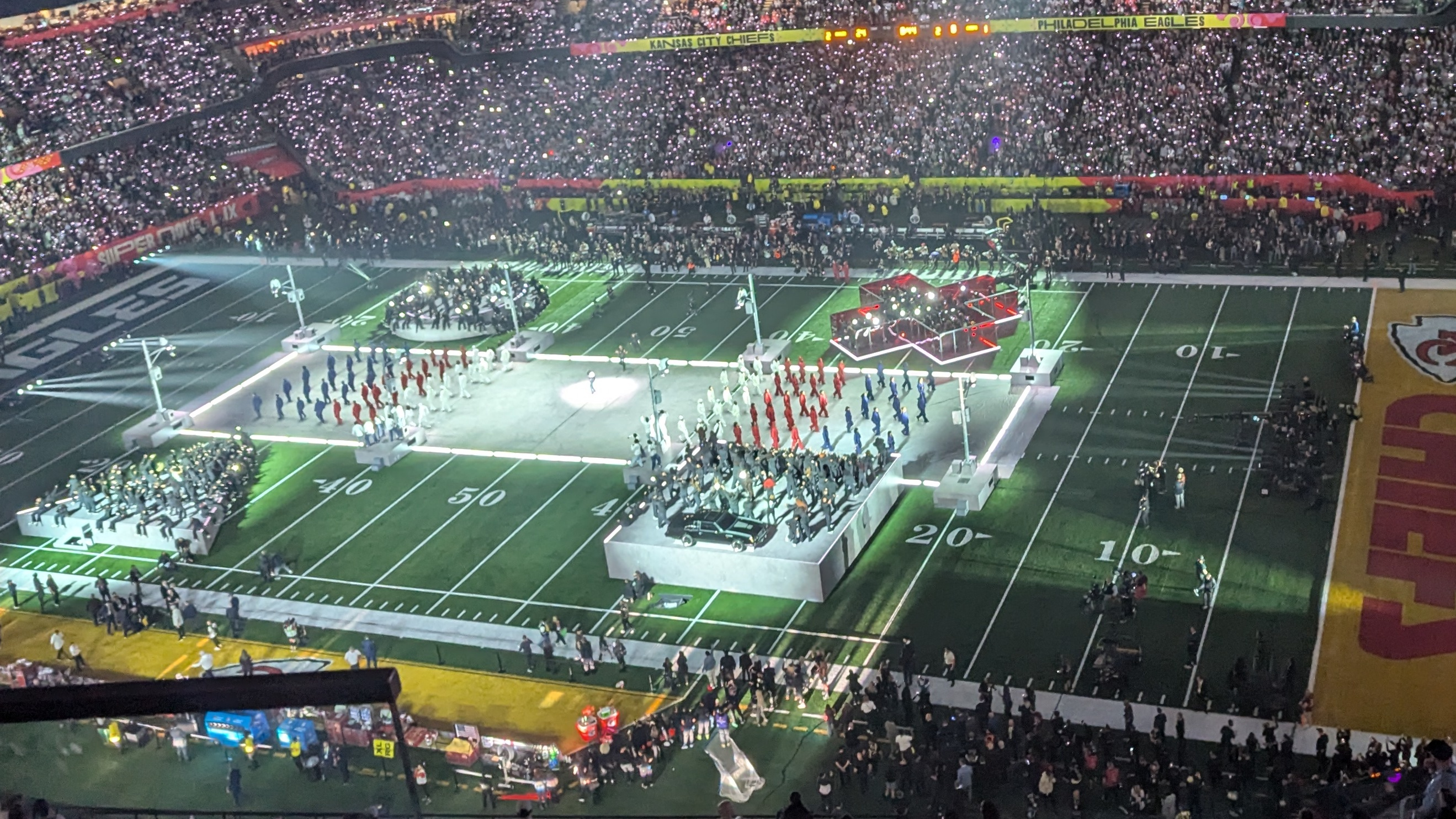
The stage for the halftime show

The introduction to Lamar's performance began with an instrumental version of Ghais Guevara's "The Old Guard is Dead." The performance began with Kendrick Lamar and his backup dancers getting out of a 1980s Buick GNX and onto a stage resembling part of a PlayStation controller. The opening was a portion of the unreleased song "Bodies". Samuel L. Jackson appeared in a recurring role as Uncle Sam, who provided satirical commentary and advice to Kendrick between songs to illustrate the cultural divide of America. Lamar initially teased a performance of "Not Like Us", breaking the fourth wall and stating "I wanna play their favorite song, but you know they love to sue." Lamar played "Luther" and "All the Stars" with SZA before returning to "Not Like Us". Lamar looked directly into the camera with a smile when he rapped "Say Drake, I hear you like 'em young". The lyric including the word "pedophile" was censored, but the audience could be heard shouting the lyric "tryna strike a chord and it's probably A minor" along with him a few lines later.

Professional tennis player Serena Williams, who shares Lamar's hometown of Compton, made a cameo appearance as a dancer doing a crip walk during "Not Like Us", a reference to Williams performing a similar dance after her victory at the 2012 Summer Olympics, for which she faced some criticism. Williams's appearance was also received as a diss towards Drake, with whom she was rumored to have dated several years earlier. The performance was capped off by "TV Off" with Mustard coming out as a special guest, finally with Lamar "turning the TV off" and the words "game over" being displayed through crowd wristband lights.

=== Flag protester incident ===
A protester waving the Sudanese flag and the Palestinian flag with the words "Sudan" and "Gaza" written on it, as well as a heart and a raised fist, stood on the stage during Lamar's performance on top of a black GNX, and ran around the field before being tackled by security. The man, named Zul-Qarnain Nantambu, a member of Lamar's field cast, had concealed the flag on his person without the knowledge of organizers before unfurling it during the performance. Roc Nation stated that the protest "was neither planned nor part of the production and was never in any rehearsal." The performer was "banned for life" from all NFL stadiums and events. The New Orleans Police initially stated they were "working to determine applicable charges" against the performer, but later confirmed they would not file charges.

== Reception ==
=== Critical reception ===
Lamar's performance was widely acclaimed. Lisa Respers France of CNN called "Not Like Us" the star of the halftime performance, while Maria Sherman of the Associated Press described Lamar performing the song on the biggest stage in American sport as another step in Lamar's continued victory lap in his feud with Drake. Jon Caramanica of The New York Times described his performance as "quite a spectacle — perhaps the peak of any rap battle, ever". Mark Beaumont of The Independent stated his "performance will undoubtedly go down as one of the most important halftime shows in the history of the event, if not the most significant mass-televised rap performance of all time". Sam Wolfson of The Guardian commented that he "chose artistry over more obvious showmanship in an unusual set".

Sidney Madden, writing for NPR, commented on the underlying message of the performance, claiming that "Lamar played into fears that he's too dangerous for the country's biggest stage with sinister pleasure, making it clear that he would not soften his contempt or his approach for the mass audience." Historian Anita L. Wills, writing in the San Francisco Bay View, said Lamar's performance "reignited the Civil Rights Movement's spirit on a global scale" and likened Samuel L. Jackson's portrayal of Uncle Sam to a gatekeeper "standing between the masses and the white moneyed establishment."

=== Themes and analysis ===
Prior to the event, Lamar discussed his storytelling while performing, stating "I just want you to feel it. The writing is there, now it's up to me to perform it so you feel it [...] I like to carry on that sense of, make people listen, but also see and think a little." Observers noted that dancers dressed in red, white, and blue arranged themselves to display a divided American flag as Lamar performed "Humble", as well as Lamar chanting "the revolution 'bout to be televised, you picked the right time but the wrong guy" and "forty acres and a mule, this is bigger than the music". Analysis from The Root concluded that Jackson's role as Uncle Sam represented a "sanitized" America controlling the free expression of African American artists—referencing his criticism of "Squabble Up" being "too ghetto". Writing for The New York Times, Tiana Clark opined that his performance represented "the gamification of the elusive American dream", with apparent references to Squid Game and PlayStation controllers throughout his set. Writing for USA Today, Nancy Armour opined that his performance represented a rejection of President Donald Trump's vision for America.

=== Viewership ===
The show was televised nationally in the U.S. by Fox and Fox Deportes, and streamed on Tubi and NFL+. The performance was seen by an average of 133.5 million viewers domestically across broadcast television and streaming platforms during the 15 minute-long set, surpassing Michael Jackson's performance at the Super Bowl XXVII halftime show in 1993. The increase was largely driven by a strong lead-in, as the event's viewership peaked at 137.7 million viewers during the 15-minute segment of the game shortly before the halftime show and had begun to decline as the halftime show began.

=== Accolades ===
Accolades received by Super Bowl LIX halftime show
Award	Date of ceremony	Category	Recipient(s)	Result	Ref.
Primetime Creative Arts Emmy Awards	September 7, 2025	Outstanding Choreography for Variety or Reality Programming	Charm La'Donna	Nominated	
Primetime Creative Arts Emmy Awards	September 7, 2025	Outstanding Directing for a Variety Special	Hamish Hamilton	Nominated	
Primetime Creative Arts Emmy Awards	September 7, 2025	Outstanding Music Direction	Kendrick Lamar and Tony Russell	Won	
Primetime Emmy Awards	September 14, 2025	Outstanding Variety Special (Live)	Shawn Carter, Desiree Perez, Jesse Collins and Dave Free, executive producers; Dionne Harmon, Dave Meyers, Anthony Saleh and Cornell Brown, co-executive producers; Aaron B. Cooke, supervising producer; Jana Fleishman, producer; Phil Sino-Cruz and Chelsea Gonnering, line producers; Kendrick Lamar, performer	Nominated	
NAACP Image Awards	February 23, 2026	Outstanding Short-Form Series or Special - Reality/Nonfiction/Documentary	Kendrick Lamar	Won	

== Set list ==
Source: Billboard

1. "Bodies" (with elements of "Wacced Out Murals")
2. "Squabble Up"
3. "Humble"
4. "DNA"
5. "Euphoria"
6. "Man at the Garden"
7. "Peekaboo"
8. "Luther" (with SZA)
9. "All the Stars" (with SZA)
10. "Not Like Us"
11. "TV Off" (with Mustard)
