= Heart Pt. 6 =

2024 song by Kendrick Lamar

Song by Kendrick Lamar

from the album GNX
- Released: November 22, 2024
- Recorded: 2024
- Genre: R&B; hip-hop soul
- Length: 4:52
- Label: PGLang; Interscope
- Songwriters: Kendrick Duckworth; Mark Spears; Jack Antonoff; Matthew Bernard; Julian Nievez-Mays; Chad Hugo; Pharrell Williams; Tammy Lucas
- Producers: Sounwave; Antonoff; M-Tech (add.); Juju the Fool (add.)

Audio video
- "heart pt. 6" on YouTube

GNX track listing
- 12 tracks: 1. "Wacced Out Murals"; 2. "Squabble Up"; 3. "Luther"; 4. "Man at the Garden"; 5. "Hey Now"; 6. "Reincarnated"; 7. "TV Off"; 8. "Dodger Blue"; 9. "Peekaboo"; 10. "Heart Pt. 6"; 11. "GNX"; 12. "Gloria"

"Heart Pt. 6" (Note: It is sometimes referred to as "The Heart Part 6" as is the format of the other "Heart" tracks.) (stylized in all lowercase) is a song recorded by American rapper Kendrick Lamar. It was surprise-released under PGLang and Interscope Records as the tenth track from his sixth studio album, GNX, on November 22, 2024. It serves as the sixth installment in "The Heart" song series, following "The Heart Part 5", and is the first to not be a promotional single released prior to a project. The song was produced by Sounwave and Jack Antonoff, with additional production by Matthew "M-Tech" Bernard and Julian "Juju the Fool" Nievez-Mays. The song features uncredited vocals from R&B trio SWV, sampled from their track "Use Your Heart", written and produced by Chad Hugo and Pharrell Williams, as the Neptunes. The track also features additional background vocals from American singer Sam Dew.

== Background ==
"The Heart" is the title of a series of songs by Kendrick Lamar, starting with "The Heart Part 1" in 2010. "The Heart Part 5" was released in 2022. In May 2024, during the public feud between Lamar and Canadian rapper Drake, Drake released a diss track against Lamar titled "The Heart Part 6"; Billboard magazine wrote this was Drake using Lamar's own song titles against him. Lamar released his own song titled "Heart Pt. 6" on his album GNX later that year, which Billboard viewed as him reclaiming the song title, while not acknowledging Drake's song by subtly changing the title.

== Composition ==
The song begins with a 12-second soft guitar solo, before later progressing into slow R&B-styled production. The lyrics contain Kendrick Lamar reminiscing on his experiences with his initial label Top Dawg Entertainment (TDE), and creating music along with. In the second verse, he then expands on the idea called "TDE", and mentioning peers such as Dave Free, record producer Sounwave (who is one of the producers of the song), mixing engineer Derek Ali, Anthony "Top Dawg" Tiffith, who is the founder of Top Dawg Entertainment, and former label-mates Punch, Jay Rock, Schoolboy Q and Ab-Soul, later explaining in the third verse, as to why the supergroup Black Hippy didn't work out, rapping

“Now it's about Kendrick, I wanna evolve, place my skillset as a black exec / I jog my memory, knowing Black Hippy didn't work 'cause of me / Creatively, I moved on, with new concepts in reach”

whilst also explaining his departure from TDE altogether. He ends the song off by giving advice to people younger than him.

== Charts ==
=== Weekly charts ===
Weekly chart performance for "Heart Pt. 6"
| Chart (2024) | Peak position |
|---|---|
| Australia (ARIA) | 35 |
| Australia Hip Hop/R&B (ARIA) | 9 |
| Canada Hot 100 (Billboard) | 30 |
| Global 200 (Billboard) | 16 |
| Israel (Mako Hitlist) | 100 |
| Lithuania (AGATA) | 25 |
| New Zealand (Recorded Music NZ) | 22 |
| South Africa (TOSAC) | 12 |
| Sweden (Sverigetopplistan) | 87 |
| UK Streaming (OCC) | 49 |
| UK Hip Hop/R&B (Official Charts) | 40 |
| US Billboard Hot 100 | 14 |
| US Hot R&B/Hip-Hop Songs (Billboard) | 10 |

=== Year-end charts ===
Year-end chart performance for "Heart Pt. 6"
| Chart (2025) | Position |
|---|---|
| US Hot R&B/Hip-Hop Songs (Billboard) | 72 |

== Certifications ==
Certifications
| Region | Certification | Certified units/sales |
|---|---|---|
| Brazil (Pro-Música Brasil) | Gold | 20,000^{‡} |
^{‡} Sales+streaming figures based on certification alone.
