= Gloria (Kendrick Lamar and SZA song) =

2024 song by Kendrick Lamar and SZA

Song by Kendrick Lamar and SZA

from the album GNX
- Released: November 22, 2024
- Genre: Hip-hop; R&B
- Length: 4:47
- Label: PGLang; Interscope
- Songwriters: Kendrick Duckworth; Solána Rowe; Atia Boggs; Deyra Barrera; Dominik Patrzek; Jorge Castañeda
- Producers: Sounwave; Jack Antonoff; Deats

GNX track listing
- 12 tracks: 1. "Wacced Out Murals"; 2. "Squabble Up"; 3. "Luther"; 4. "Man at the Garden"; 5. "Hey Now"; 6. "Reincarnated"; 7. "TV Off"; 8. "Dodger Blue"; 9. "Peekaboo"; 10. "Heart Pt. 6"; 11. "GNX"; 12. "Gloria"

"Gloria" (stylized in all lowercase) is a song by rapper Kendrick Lamar and singer-songwriter SZA. It is the closing track of Lamar's sixth studio album, GNX (2024). It was produced by Sounwave, Jack Antonoff, and Dominik "Deats" Patrzek.

== Background and release ==
Rapper Kendrick Lamar and singer-songwriter SZA are known for their longstanding work relationship. Their series of collaborations began in 2014 with SZA's "Babylon", a track from her third extended play, Z. The duo released four more songs together during the succeeding nine years. (Note: "Easy Bake" (with Jay Rock), "Untitled 04 | 08.14.2014", "Doves in the Wind", and "All the Stars". This list does not include songs by Lamar that have hidden vocals from SZA.)

In October 2024, SZA posted on social media to suggest that a new studio album by Lamar was coming soon. It would be his sixth, following 2022's Mr. Morale & the Big Steppers. The upcoming album was surprise-released next month on November 22. Titled GNX, it contains several collaborations with other musicians, including two songs with SZA.

== Composition ==
Critics have noted the song bears similarities to "I Used to Love H.E.R." by Common and "I Gave You Power" by Nas. The song contains a sample of "Amarga Tristeza", written by Jorge Castañeda and performed by Combo Impacto, while Mexican singer Deyra Barrera performs an interlude, bringing mariachi sounds to the track. Over an instrumental composed of violin and strings, Kendrick Lamar reflects on the complications of a relationship, claiming to have commitment issues with his partner he's been with since adolescence. SZA plays the role of the woman he loves. Lamar gives the impression that he is referring to his wife Whitney Alford, but reveals in the end that he is discussing his relationship with his pen—which he has personified as a woman named Gloria—as an extended, detailed metaphor in an ode to writing music.

== Critical reception ==
Michael Saponara of Billboard placed "Gloria" at number 8 in his ranking of the songs from GNX. In a review of the album, Peter A. Berry of Variety regarded Kendrick Lamar as a "bit less successful" on the song, commenting that "announcing a song's central metaphor on the literal track in 2024 is a little less forgivable than when Nas did it in 1996. And yet, the chorus and Kendrick's conviction mostly sell it anyway, even if the LP could have closed on a more climactic crescendo." Drew Gillis of The A.V. Club described the production as "absolutely gorgeous, one of a handful of tracks that nod to 1970s-style slow jams to great effect."

== Live performances ==
Lamar and SZA debuted "Gloria" during the Minneapolis stop of their Grand National Tour, held in April 2025. The duo performed it as the concert's final song. After they concluded the set, SZA and Lamar got into a GNX and descended underneath the stage while the lights dimmed.

== Charts ==
=== Weekly charts ===
Weekly chart performance for "Gloria"
Chart (2024)	Peak position
Australia (ARIA)	51
Australia Hip Hop/R&B (ARIA)	12
Canada Hot 100 (Billboard)	40
Global 200 (Billboard)	32
Lithuania (AGATA)	45
New Zealand (Recorded Music NZ)	23
South Africa (Billboard)	19
Sweden Heatseeker (Sverigetopplistan)	5
US Billboard Hot 100	27
US Hot R&B/Hip-Hop Songs (Billboard)	13

=== Year-end charts ===
Year-end chart performance for "Gloria"
Chart (2025)	Position
US Hot R&B/Hip-Hop Songs (Billboard)	79
