= Went Legit =

2024 single by G Herbo

Single by G Herbo

from the album Greatest Rapper Alive and Lil Herb
- Released: August 29, 2025
- Studio: Acosta Park Studios
- Genre: Drill
- Length: 2:20
- Label: 150 Dream Team; Machine Entertainment Group LLC
- Songwriters: Herbert Wright III; Joshua Luellen; Matthew-Kyle Brown
- Producer: Daniel Ivy

Music video
- "Went Legit" on YouTube

"Went Legit" is a song by the American rapper G Herbo that went viral in mid-2025. It was first seen in December 2024 as an additional track on his eighth mixtape Greatest Rapper Alive, exclusive to his MySeat-based streaming app. A music video for the song was uploaded to YouTube on February 3, 2025. "Went Legit" first charted in May 2025 on Billboard's Hot R&B/Hip-Hop Songs listing. It entered the Billboard Hot 100 pop chart in July 2025 as it was going viral on TikTok, hitting 10 million Spotify streams. A popular video remix was made in July by the comedian Druski.

After being certified gold by the Recording Industry Association of America (RIAA) on August 15, 2025, the song was officially released on August 29 as a single from Herbo's seventh album, Lil Herb (2025). It was produced by Daniel Ivy. The single peaked at number 73 on the Hot 100 on October 25, and it peaked at number 14 on the hip-hop chart on November 1. The song was certified platinum by the RIAA in January 2026, G Herbo's first solo platinum record.

== Composition ==
In the song, G Herbo raps in his signature off-beat flow over a drill beat. Lyrically, he reflects on his journey to success, resilience and surviving in the streets, and boasts the wealth that he has earned as a result.

== Charts ==
=== Weekly charts ===
Weekly chart performance for "Went Legit"
Chart (2025)	Peak position
US Billboard Hot 100	70
US Hot R&B/Hip-Hop Songs (Billboard)	13
US Rhythmic Airplay (Billboard)	32

=== Year-end charts ===
Year-end chart performance for "Went Legit"
Chart (2025)	Position
US Hot R&B/Hip-Hop Songs (Billboard)	38

== Certifications ==
Certifications for "Went Legit"
Region	Certification	Certified units/sales
United States (RIAA)	Platinum	1,000,000^{‡}
^{‡} Sales+streaming figures based on certification alone.
