= Typa =

2025 single by GloRilla

Single by GloRilla
- Released: June 6, 2025
- Genre: Hip-hop
- Length: 2:04
- Label: Collective; Interscope
- Songwriters: Gloria Woods; Keyshia Cole; Thomas Brown; Gregory Curtis; Courtlin Edwards; Marqueze Parker
- Producers: Tommy Brown; Courtlin Jabrae; Leather Jacket

GloRilla singles chronology
"Never Need" (2025)	"Typa" (2025)	"Killin' It Girl" (2025)

Music video
- "Typa" on YouTube

"Typa" is a single by American rapper GloRilla. She first previewed the song during her set at Coachella 2025, before releasing it on June 6, 2025. It contains a sample of "Love" by Keyshia Cole and was produced by Tommy Brown, Courtlin Jabrae and Leather Jacket.

== Content ==
The song finds GloRilla describing the type of man that she is in love with, namely a gangster from the streets. She admits she is "outside" and wants him to be the same.

== Music video ==
The music video was directed by Benny Boom and released alongside the single. It stars NFL player Xavier Legette as GloRilla's love interest. The two are physically close together throughout the clip, engage in sex and share a kiss. In addition, GloRilla raps on a city street and watches as Legette conducts illegal business. They deal with the police, Legette bails GloRilla out of jail, and they count up their large amounts of money. The video also features a cameo from Keyshia Cole, who gives GloRilla advice on love as they share their thoughts on the topic over mimosas overlooking a view of the bay.

== Charts ==
=== Weekly charts ===
Chart performance for "Typa"
Chart (2025)	Peak position
New Zealand Hot Singles (RMNZ)	14
US Billboard Hot 100	42
US Hot R&B/Hip-Hop Songs (Billboard)	10
US Rhythmic Airplay (Billboard)	5

=== Year-end charts ===
Year-end chart performance for "Typa"
Chart (2025)	Position
US Hot R&B/Hip-Hop Songs (Billboard)	42
US Rhythmic Airplay (Billboard)	46

== Release history ==
Release dates and formats for "Typa"
Region	Date	Format	Label	Ref.
United States	July 1, 2025	Rhythmic crossover	Interscope Capitol	
