= Reincarnated (song) =

2024 song by Kendrick Lamar

Song by Kendrick Lamar

from the album GNX
- Released: November 22, 2024
- Genre: Hip-hop
- Length: 4:35
- Label: PGLang; Interscope
- Songwriters: Kendrick Duckworth; Mark Spears; Jack Antonoff; Matthew Bernard; Noah Ehler; Deyra Barrera; Tupac Shakur; Malcolm Greenridge; Yafau Fula; Bruce Washington; Katari Cox; Mutah Beale
- Producers: Sounwave; Antonoff; Lamar; M-Tech; Ehler

Audio video
- "Reincarnated" on YouTube

GNX track listing
- 12 tracks: 1. "Wacced Out Murals"; 2. "Squabble Up"; 3. "Luther"; 4. "Man at the Garden"; 5. "Hey Now"; 6. "Reincarnated"; 7. "TV Off"; 8. "Dodger Blue"; 9. "Peekaboo"; 10. "Heart Pt. 6"; 11. "GNX"; 12. "Gloria"

"Reincarnated" (stylized in all lowercase) is a song by American rapper Kendrick Lamar, released on November 22, 2024, from his sixth studio album, GNX. It contains a sample of "Made Niggaz" by Tupac Shakur (a song from the soundtrack to the film Gang Related) and was produced by Sounwave, Jack Antonoff, Lamar himself, Matthew "M-Tech" Bernard, and Noah Ehler.

== Composition and lyrics ==
The song starts with an introduction by Mexican singer Deyra Barrera, who sings in Spanish "Que reflejan tu mirada / La noche, tú y yo" ("That reflect your look / The night, you and me"). Over the instrumental of "Made Niggaz", Kendrick Lamar performs in cadences evoking Shakur's vocal style and raps from multiple perspectives, namely that of singers John Lee Hooker and Billie Holiday, himself, God, and Lucifer. The first two verses find him recounting being a guitarist that manipulated and lied to the masses and music industry for unfair profit (Hooker) and a Black woman performer on the Chitlin' Circuit whose drug addiction led to her death (Holliday). Lamar notes that both of them were abandoned by their fathers and imagines himself as a reincarnation of these musicians who is reflecting on his past lives. In the third and final verse, he raps from his present-day position and enters a conversation with one he calls his father (referring to both his actual deceased father and God), who interrogates Lamar and admonishes him for his contradictions. Speaking between the viewpoints of himself and Lucifer, Lamar expresses shame for his past mistakes and asserts he has reformed, discussing he has been preventing his fame from negatively influencing him and now uses his gifts to perform acts of kindness, bring peace and protect and help others (e.g. "I put 100 hoods on one stage," a reference to The Pop Out: Ken & Friends), promising to continue doing so.

== Critical reception ==
The song received generally positive reviews from music critics. Billboard's Michael Saponara ranked it as the best song from GNX. Alexander Cole of HotNewHipHop called it a "phenomenal tribute that comes with Kendrick's signature storytelling." Matthew Kim of The Line of Best Fit considered it "one of the finest storytelling songs of Lamar's career". Karl Blakesley of Clash praised the song for its "exceptional production". Kitty Empire of The Observer described it as "brilliant, wide-ranging". Reviewing the album for MusicOMH, Ben Devlin wrote "It culminates with Kendrick appearing to break the cycle of fame and corruption, and while this resolution isn't as detailed or hard-won as Mother I Sober the track is certainly powerful with production cribbed from 2Pac's Made Niggaz." Writing for HotNewHipHop, Aron A. called the song a "masterclass in storytelling" and commented Lamar "masterfully channels Tupac Shakur's cadence".

Dakota West Foss of Sputnikmusic had a mixed reaction to the song, stating the content is "definitionally ridiculous and patently, capital-D Deep like some of the Kendrick songs of yore, but his flow and performance are once again in top form to deliver what is probably one of the best raps of the year in a year already full of great ones." Reviewing GNX for Pitchfork, Alphonse Pierre criticized the song, writing "Unlistenable is 'reincarnated,' a homage to Tupac at his most paranoid and disoriented, where Kendrick writes from the perspective of old-time artistic influences. These writerly songs he's prone to, like this one or TPAB's 'Mortal Man,' have always been more technically impressive than anything else. It doesn't help that 'reincarnated' also feels like it exists to spite Drake for making that AI Tupac song that I forgot ever existed."

== Charts ==
=== Weekly charts ===
Weekly chart performance for "Reincarnated"
Chart (2024)	Peak position
Australia (ARIA)	25
Australia Hip Hop/R&B (ARIA)	6
Canada Hot 100 (Billboard)	21
Global 200 (Billboard)	12
Latvia (LaIPA)	20
Lithuania (AGATA)	20
New Zealand (Recorded Music NZ)	17
South Africa Streaming (TOSAC)	8
Sweden (Sverigetopplistan)	65
UK Streaming (OCC)	41
UK Hip Hop/R&B (Official Charts)	38
US Billboard Hot 100	8
US Hot R&B/Hip-Hop Songs (Billboard)	6

=== Year-end charts ===
Year-end chart performance for "Reincarnated"
Chart (2025)	Position
US Hot R&B/Hip-Hop Songs (Billboard)	61

== Certifications ==
Certifications for "Reincarnated"
Region	Certification	Certified units/sales
Brazil (Pro-Música Brasil)	Gold	20,000^{‡}
^{‡} Sales+streaming figures based on certification alone.
