= Peekaboo (song) =

2025 single by Kendrick Lamar featuring AzChike

Single by Kendrick Lamar featuring AzChike

from the album GNX
- Released: February 26, 2025
- Genre: West Coast hip-hop
- Length: 2:35
- Label: PGLang; Interscope
- Songwriters: Kendrick Duckworth; Damaria Walker; Mark Spears; Scott Bridgeway; Sean Momberger; Willie Hale; Michel Legrand; Willie Clarke
- Producers: Sounwave; Bridgeway; Momberger

Kendrick Lamar singles chronology
"30 for 30" (2025)	"Peekaboo" (2025)	"Backd00r" (2025)

AzChike singles chronology
"Whatx2" (2025)	"Peekaboo" (2025)	"Hit A Nerve" (2025)

GNX track listing
- 12 tracks: 1. "Wacced Out Murals"; 2. "Squabble Up"; 3. "Luther"; 4. "Man at the Garden"; 5. "Hey Now"; 6. "Reincarnated"; 7. "TV Off"; 8. "Dodger Blue"; 9. "Peekaboo"; 10. "Heart Pt. 6"; 11. "GNX"; 12. "Gloria"

"Peekaboo" (stylized in all lowercase) is a song by the American rapper Kendrick Lamar featuring fellow American rapper AzChike. It contains a sample of "Give Me a Helping Hand" by Willie Hale. The song was produced by Sounwave, Ruchaun "Scott Bridgeway" Akers, and Sean Momberger. It was released to US rhythmic radio on February 26, 2025, as the fourth single from Lamar's sixth studio album, GNX, through PGLang and Interscope Records.

== Background ==
AzChike first met Kendrick Lamar at his concert The Pop Out: Ken & Friends on Juneteenth in 2024 at the Kia Forum in Inglewood, California, where AzChike also performed the song "Light It Up" along with Rucci during the first set by DJ Hed, titled the Act I – DJ Hed & Friends. They had no contact with each other at the time, but had common friends in Top Dawg Entertainment such as rapper Schoolboy Q.

AzChike was not aware of the song until he went to the studio. He described their session as "chill". The original song was much longer, with AzChike recording four verses. Lamar imitated his rapping and told AzChike he was mumbling and to rap clearly. AzChike was originally planned to perform the hook, but had trouble. He recalled in an interview with Brown Bag Mornings on Power 106:

They had me do the hook by itself but that shit is a tongue-twister. I told 'em even when I heard it the first time. Before I even knew they wanted me to do the hook by myself like that, I was like, "Damn. He saying this shit fast as fuck!" And when I told him he was like, "Bro, I just did so many takes. I just kept doing it." So when I went to go do it the first time, I couldn't do it by myself. I had to hear him say it. It had to play while I said it.

"Peekaboo" is the only song on GNX to not feature songwriting or production by Jack Antonoff.

== Composition ==
The song contains "skeletal yet bouncy" production, consisting of an unsyncopated bass shifting between the high and low ends of an octave and muffled, "stark and ominous" chords in the background. Kendrick Lamar performs in a vocal delivery similar to that of rapper Drakeo the Ruler. Lyrically, he directs criticism at posers and inauthentic rappers, as well as those trying to tarnish his legacy.

== Critical reception ==
The song received generally positive reviews from music critics. Michael Saponara of Billboard placed it at number 11 (second to last) in his ranking of the songs from GNX, commenting "'Peekaboo' is a perfect descriptor aligning Lamar's career. He only comes out of hiding on his own terms to shake up the game and then can go back into hibernation for months without anyone hearing a word, a social media post, a TMZ paparazzi photo or anything from him. As Charlamagne Tha God described him, K. Dot really is rap's boogeyman or the rap version of WWE legend Undertaker. Was that Kendrick mimicking NBA star Kawhi Leonard's viral 'hey, hey, hey' clip? This guy can work just about anything into the flow of a song." Variety's Peter A. Berry wrote, "At times, the production is as inventive as the lyrics. For 'Peekaboo,' Sounwave re-engineers a Little Beaver sample into a sinister 405 joyride. Embedded with strong features from fellow Cali native AzChike, it plays out with all the nocturnal bounce of a 'Paramedic, Part 2' with an even more indelible hook, which itself is reinforced by continual callbacks that turn every bar into a micro-chorus. Here, Lamar also serves up another reminder of his technical rap acumen — his kinetic couplets back-handspring off the beat. His words are layered in eccentric wit and convincing menace: 'Peekaboo, I just put them boogers in my chain/ Peekaboo, eighty-pointers like a Kobe game/ Peekaboo, 7.62s'll make 'em plank/ Peekaboo, poppin' out, you better not smut my name.'" Alexander Cole of HotNewHipHop stated "Kendrick sounds as menacing as ever. On numerous occasions, he and AzChike trade bars and it makes for an amazing balancing act." Pitchfork's Alphonse Pierre wrote that Lamar's "Drakeo imitation (maybe a little Young Slo-Be in there, too) is shakier than before, but AzChike's lighthearted menace steals the show." Dakota West Foss of Sputnikmusic remarked "If you loved 'Range Brothers,' you'll be enamored with 'Peekaboo', which almost single-handedly redefines what a canon Kendrick song is capable of with a hook that functions just as much as an exhausting vocal exercise -there’s even a call back to the Supahotfire!"

== Charts ==
=== Weekly charts ===
Weekly chart performance for "Peekaboo"
Chart (2024–25)	Peak position
Australia (ARIA)	48
Australia Hip Hop/R&B (ARIA)	11
Canada Hot 100 (Billboard)	35
Global 200 (Billboard)	20
Greece International (IFPI)	14
Lithuania (AGATA)	37
New Zealand (Recorded Music NZ)	29
South Africa (Billboard)	16
Sweden Heatseeker (Sverigetopplistan)	2
UK Hip Hop/R&B (Official Charts)	18
UK Singles Sales (OCC)	77
UK Streaming (OCC)	65
US Billboard Hot 100	13
US Hot R&B/Hip-Hop Songs (Billboard)	9
US R&B/Hip-Hop Airplay (Billboard)	5
US Rhythmic Airplay (Billboard)	1

=== Year-end charts ===
Year-end chart performance for "Peekaboo"
Chart (2025)	Position
US Billboard Hot 100	53
US Hot R&B/Hip-Hop Songs (Billboard)	11
US R&B/Hip-Hop Airplay (Billboard)	17
US Rhythmic Airplay (Billboard)	9

== Certifications ==
Certifications for "Peekaboo"
Region	Certification	Certified units/sales
Brazil (Pro-Música Brasil)	Gold	20,000^{‡}
New Zealand (RMNZ)	Gold	15,000^{‡}
^{‡} Sales+streaming figures based on certification alone.

== Release history ==
Release dates and formats for "Peekaboo"
Region	Date	Format(s)	Label(s)	Ref.
United States	February 26, 2025	Rhythmic contemporary radio	PGLang; Interscope	
