= TV Off =

2024 single by Kendrick Lamar featuring Lefty Gunplay

Single by Kendrick Lamar featuring Lefty Gunplay

from the album GNX
- Released: November 26, 2024
- Recorded: May 2024
- Genre: West Coast hip-hop; trap; G-funk
- Length: 3:40
- Label: PGLang; Interscope
- Songwriters: Kendrick Duckworth; Mark Spears; Jack Antonoff; Dijon McFarlane; Kamasi Washington; Sean Momberger; Larry Sanders; Jules Zaidan; Jimmy Webb; John Barry; Christopher Wallace; Jalacy Hawkins; Christopher Martin
- Producers: Sounwave; Antonoff; Mustard; Washington; Momberger; Larry Jayy

Kendrick Lamar singles chronology
"Not Like Us" (2024)	"TV Off" and "Squabble Up" (2024)	"Luther" (2024)

Audio video
- "TV Off" on YouTube

GNX track listing
- 12 tracks: 1. "Wacced Out Murals"; 2. "Squabble Up"; 3. "Luther"; 4. "Man at the Garden"; 5. "Hey Now"; 6. "Reincarnated"; 7. "TV Off"; 8. "Dodger Blue"; 9. "Peekaboo"; 10. "Heart Pt. 6"; 11. "GNX"; 12. "Gloria"

"TV Off" (stylized in all lowercase) is a song by American rapper Kendrick Lamar from his sixth studio album, GNX (2024). It was released on November 26, 2024, as one of the album's first singles through PGLang and Interscope Records. It features guest vocals by rapper Lefty Gunplay and was produced by Sounwave, Jack Antonoff, Mustard, Kamasi Washington, Sean Momberger, and Larry "Larry Jayy" Sanders. It was Billboard magazine's number-two rap song on the 2025 Year-End Hot Rap Songs chart, held from the top spot by Lamar's own "Luther."

== Background ==
Upon release, "TV Off" emerged as one of the standout tracks on the album, mainly due to its sonic resemblance to the Mustard-produced "Not Like Us", released earlier in 2024. According to Mustard, the similarities were "definitely intentional" and revealed that it was recorded around the same time as "Not Like Us" in May 2024 but at two different times, hence the beat switches. The song was especially noted for Lamar screaming Mustard's name as a transition between the two parts, subsequently popularized as a meme.

Lamar performed the second half of the song as the closing number to his Super Bowl LIX halftime show with Mustard as the guest.

== Composition and content ==
"TV Off"
The chorus of "TV Off" where Lamar shouts out record producer Mustard, which was viral online.

"TV Off" is a West Coast hip-hop song split into two distinct parts that are connected through a beat switch around the two-minute mark. The song contains samples from "MacArthur Park" by Monk Higgins, along with a snippet of horns from "The Black Hole – Overture" composed by John Barry for the soundtrack to the film The Black Hole (1979), and an interpolation from "Kick in the Door" by The Notorious B.I.G. As the production of the first part fades out, Mustard's signature tag emerges again as a "booming" percussion kicks in and is followed by Lamar's "animated" scream.

== Critical reception ==
Zachary Horvath of HotNewHipHop viewed the song as a "pseudo-sequel" to "Watch the Party Die", released exclusively on Lamar's social media in September 2024, as it furthers the idea of resetting the culture in rap music. Despite the superficial similarities to "Not Like Us", distinctions mainly stand out on the lyrical front. Lamar offers his critical stance in regards to social media and the associated distortion of perception. In a mixed review for Pitchfork, Alphonse Pierre said of the song: "Mustard's backside of 'tv off' is drowned out by these cheesy blaring horns that feel made to go dumb in Nike commercials".

The song was nominated for Best Rap Performance and won Best Rap Song at the 2026 Grammy Awards.

== Accolades ==
List of awards and nominations received by "TV Off"
Year	Award	Category	Result	Ref.
2026	Grammy Awards	Best Rap Performance	Nominated	
2026	Grammy Awards	Best Rap Song	Won	

== Charts ==
=== Weekly charts ===
Weekly chart performance for "TV Off"
Chart (2024–2025)	Peak position
Australia (ARIA)	12
Australia Hip Hop/R&B (ARIA)	3
Austria (Ö3 Austria Top 40)	21
Canada Hot 100 (Billboard)	7
Czech Republic Singles Digital (ČNS IFPI)	56
Denmark (Tracklisten)	24
Finland (Suomen virallinen lista)	39
France (SNEP)	64
Germany (GfK)	26
Global 200 (Billboard)	5
Greece International (IFPI)	2
Hungary (Single Top 40)	39
Iceland (Tónlistinn)	16
India International (IMI)	12
Ireland (IRMA)	5
Israel (Mako Hitlist)	50
Italy (FIMI)	69
Latvia Streaming (LaIPA)	6
Lithuania (AGATA)	8
Luxembourg (Billboard)	11
Netherlands (Single Top 100)	17
New Zealand (Recorded Music NZ)	5
Norway (VG-lista)	17
Philippines (Philippines Hot 100)	61
Poland (Polish Streaming Top 100)	41
Portugal (AFP)	8
Singapore (RIAS)	24
Slovakia Singles Digital (ČNS IFPI)	21
South Africa Streaming (TOSAC)	3
South Korea (Circle)	198
Sweden (Sverigetopplistan)	22
Switzerland (Schweizer Hitparade)	19
UK Singles (Official Charts)	6
UK Hip Hop/R&B (Official Charts)	2
US Billboard Hot 100	2
US Hot R&B/Hip-Hop Songs (Billboard)	1
US R&B/Hip-Hop Airplay (Billboard)	3
US Rhythmic Airplay (Billboard)	1

=== Year-end charts ===
Year-end chart performance for "TV Off"
Chart (2025)	Position
Australia (ARIA)	60
Canada (Canadian Hot 100)	45
Global 200 (Billboard)	32
New Zealand (Recorded Music NZ)	41
US Billboard Hot 100	15
US Hot R&B/Hip-Hop Songs (Billboard)	2
US Hot Rap Singles (Billboard)	2
US R&B/Hip-Hop Airplay (Billboard)	8
US Rhythmic Airplay (Billboard)	7

== Certifications ==
Certifications for "TV Off"
Region	Certification	Certified units/sales
Australia (ARIA)	Platinum	70,000^{‡}
Belgium (BRMA)	Gold	20,000^{‡}
Brazil (Pro-Música Brasil)	3× Platinum	120,000^{‡}
Denmark (IFPI Danmark)	Gold	45,000^{‡}
New Zealand (RMNZ)	2× Platinum	60,000^{‡}
Poland (ZPAV)	Gold	62,500^{‡}
Portugal (AFP)	Platinum	10,000^{‡}
United Kingdom (BPI)	Gold	400,000^{‡}
Streaming
Central America (CFC)	Gold	3,500,000^{†}
Greece (IFPI Greece)	Platinum	2,000,000^{†}
^{‡} Sales+streaming figures based on certification alone.^{†} Streaming-only figures based on certification alone.

== Release history ==
Release dates and formats for "TV Off"
Region	Date	Format(s)	Label(s)	Ref.
United States	November 26, 2024	Rhythmic crossover	PGLang; Interscope	
