= Wacced Out Murals =

2024 song by Kendrick Lamar

Song by Kendrick Lamar

from the album GNX
- Released: November 22, 2024
- Recorded: September 9, 2024
- Length: 5:18
- Label: PGLang; Interscope
- Songwriters: Kendrick Duckworth; Mark Spears; Jack Antonoff; Dacoury Natche; Craig Balmoris; Frano Huett; Tyler Mehlenbacher; Matthew Bernard; Timothy Maxey; Deyra Barrera
- Producers: Sounwave; Antonoff; Balmoris; Dahi; Frano; Tyler Reese; M-Tech (add.); Tim Maxey (add.)

Audio video
- "wacced out murals" on YouTube

GNX track listing
- 12 tracks: 1. "Wacced Out Murals"; 2. "Squabble Up"; 3. "Luther"; 4. "Man at the Garden"; 5. "Hey Now"; 6. "Reincarnated"; 7. "TV Off"; 8. "Dodger Blue"; 9. "Peekaboo"; 10. "Heart Pt. 6"; 11. "GNX"; 12. "Gloria"

"Wacced Out Murals" (stylized in all lowercase) is a song by American rapper Kendrick Lamar. It was released through PGLang and Interscope Records from his sixth studio album, GNX, on November 22, 2024. The song was produced by Sounwave, Jack Antonoff, Craig Balmoris, Dahi, Frano, and Tyler Reese, with additional production by Matthew "M-Tech" Bernard and Tim Maxey. The song features vocals by Mexican mariachi-singer Deyra Barrera, who also co-wrote the song with Lamar.

== Content ==
The song starts with a vocal introduction in Spanish by Deyra Barrera.

The first verse focuses on the mixed reactions to Lamar's announcement as the headliner for the 2025 Super Bowl Halftime Show. Lamar reflects on his disappointment with a lack of support from some artists. He also acknowledges his gratitude for positive recognition, notably from Nas, whom he praises for offering congratulations after his Super Bowl win. Shortly after the release of GNX, Nas praised and congratulated Lamar through a post on his Instagram account.

In the second verse, Lamar addresses Lil Wayne, who publicly expressed dissatisfaction with not being chosen to perform at the Super Bowl in his hometown of New Orleans. On the song he alludes to this tension with the line,

"Used to bump Tha Carter III, I held my Rollie chain proud. Irony, I think my hard work let Lil Wayne down".

Wayne responded on the 23rd of November, through a post on his X account:

"Man wtf I do?! I just be chillin & dey still kome 4 my head. Let’s not take kindness for weakness. Let this giant sleep. I beg u all. No one really wants destruction,not even me but I shall destroy if disturbed. On me. Love"

The track also mentions Snoop Dogg, who shared the diss track by Drake, "Taylor Made", amidst their feud. Lamar references this event with the lines,

"Snoop posted 'Taylor Made,' I pray it was the edibles. I couldn't believe it, it's only right for me to let it go"

Snoop responded the following day, writing on X:

"K dot new album GNX 💥🔥🔥🔥🔥🎤🎤🎤🎤🎤 It was the edibles 🤦🏾 😆👊🏿 west west king 🔥🎶💫"

== Personnel ==
- Kendrick Lamar – vocals
- Dahi – producer, drums, programming, keyboards, synthesizers
- Frano – producer, keyboards, synthesizers
- Sounwave – producer, programming, arrangement
- Jack Antonoff – producer, programming, percussion, keyboards, cello, acoustic guitars, engineer
- Tyler Reese – producer
- Craig Balmoris – producer
- M-Tech – additional production, ambient synthesizer, keyboards
- Tim Maxey – additional production
- Deyra Barrera – additional vocals
- Ray Charles Brown Jr. – engineer
- Johnathan Turner – engineer
- Laura Sisk – engineer
- Oli Jacobs – engineer, mixing
- Ruairi O'Flaherty – mastering

== Charts ==
=== Weekly charts ===
Weekly chart performance for "Wacced Out Murals"
Chart (2024)	Peak position
Australia (ARIA)	18
Australia Hip Hop/R&B (ARIA)	5
Canada Hot 100 (Billboard)	10
Global 200 (Billboard)	6
Israel (Mako Hitlist)	69
Latvia Streaming (LaIPA)	10
Lithuania (AGATA)	14
Luxembourg (Billboard)	25
New Zealand (Recorded Music NZ)	9
Norway (VG-lista)	37
Poland (Polish Streaming Top 100)	64
South Africa Streaming (TOSAC)	5
Sweden (Sverigetopplistan)	44
UK Hip Hop/R&B (Official Charts)	30
UK Streaming (OCC)	24
US Billboard Hot 100	4
US Hot R&B/Hip-Hop Songs (Billboard)	4

=== Year-end charts ===
Year-end chart performance for "Wacced Out Murals"
Chart (2025)	Position
US Hot R&B/Hip-Hop Songs (Billboard)	35

== Certifications ==
Certifications
Region	Certification	Certified units/sales
Brazil (Pro-Música Brasil)	Gold	20,000^{‡}
^{‡} Sales+streaming figures based on certification alone.
