= Hey Now (Kendrick Lamar song) =

Song by Kendrick Lamar featuring Dody6

from the album GNX
- Released: November 22, 2024
- Length: 3:37
- Label: PGLang; Interscope
- Songwriters: Kendrick Duckworth; Zarius Cunningham; Mark Spears; Jack Antonoff; Barry Adams; Dijon McFarlane; Lefabian Williams
- Producers: Sounwave; Antonoff; Mustard

GNX track listing
- 12 tracks: 1. "Wacced Out Murals"; 2. "Squabble Up"; 3. "Luther"; 4. "Man at the Garden"; 5. "Hey Now"; 6. "Reincarnated"; 7. "TV Off"; 8. "Dodger Blue"; 9. "Peekaboo"; 10. "Heart Pt. 6"; 11. "GNX"; 12. "Gloria"

"Hey Now" (stylized in all lowercase) is a song by American rapper Kendrick Lamar featuring fellow American rapper Dody6. It is the fifth track on Lamar's sixth studio album, GNX, which was surprise released under PGLang and Interscope Records on November 22, 2024. The song was produced by Sounwave, Jack Antonoff, and Mustard and interpolates the song "Scotty" (2005) by D4L.

== Background ==
The instrumental for "Hey Now" was first created by Mustard in 2019. In an interview with People, he stated that he wanted the song to be the "West Coast version" of the single "Grindin'" by American hip-hop duo Clipse, which inspired the track's minimalist approach. He shopped the song around to multiple different artists, such as YG and Quavo, who both turned it down. The only artist who ended up recording for the song was singer Ty Dolla Sign, though he never released his version. In an interview with BagFuel, Ty Dolla Sign revealed that his version was recorded as part of a collaborative album between him and Mustard, but failed to drop because his label didn't think Mustard was popular enough at the time.

== Critical reception ==
Passion of the Weiss wrote that the song was "Kendrick at his best. He snarls throughout the hook and his verses, the delivery is scathing, and he realizes the ultra-dark whispers of Bris and Young Slo-Be while maintaining their bite and love for blue strips."

Hits Daily Double stated that the song was riddled with "subliminal Drake digs" and "haymakers about strangling goats". Forte similarly speculated the song to be a subtle reflection on the Drake–Kendrick Lamar feud.

== Tyler, the Creator remix ==
On Christmas 2024, Tyler, the Creator released a freestyle remix and music video of "Hey Now" titled "That Guy". Lyrically, the freestyle remix discusses Tyler's riches and possessions, as well as his guest appearance at Lamar's event, The Pop Out: Ken & Friends; he also hinted at a deluxe version of Chromakopia. The music video features Tyler in Los Angeles with several Odd Future alumni including Jasper Dolphin, Travis Bennett, and Lionel Boyce. On June 26, 2026, "That Guy" was released on streaming services.

== Personnel ==
- Kendrick Lamar – vocals
- Mustard – producer, programming, drums
- Sounwave – producer, programming, arrangement
- Jack Antonoff – producer, programming, keyboards, engineer
- Sam Dew – background vocals
- Ray Charles Brown Jr. – engineer
- Johnathan Turner – engineer
- Laura Sisk – engineer
- Oli Jacobs – engineer, mixing
- Ruairi O'Flaherty – mastering

== Charts ==
=== Weekly charts ===
Weekly chart performance for "Hey Now"
Chart (2024)	Peak position
Australia (ARIA)	26
Australia Hip Hop/R&B (ARIA)	7
Canada Hot 100 (Billboard)	18
Israel (Mako Hitlist)	90
Lithuania (AGATA)	25
New Zealand (Recorded Music NZ)	22
UK Streaming (OCC)	46
US Billboard Hot 100	5
US Hot R&B/Hip-Hop Songs (Billboard)	5

=== Year-end charts ===
Year-end chart performance for "Hey Now"
Chart (2025)	Position
US Hot R&B/Hip-Hop Songs (Billboard)	24

== Certifications ==
Certifications
Region	Certification	Certified units/sales
Brazil (Pro-Música Brasil)	Gold	20,000^{‡}
^{‡} Sales+streaming figures based on certification alone.
