= Squabble Up =

2024 single by Kendrick Lamar

Single by Kendrick Lamar

from the album GNX
- Released: November 26, 2024
- Recorded: June-July 2024
- Genre: G-funk; hyphy
- Length: 2:37
- Label: PGLang; Interscope
- Composers: Kendrick Duckworth; Mark Spears; Jack Antonoff; Matthew Bernard; Scott Bridgeway; Tony Butler
- Lyricist: Kendrick Duckworth
- Producers: Sounwave; Antonoff; Lamar; Bridgeway; M-Tech (add.)

Kendrick Lamar singles chronology
"Not Like Us" (2024)	"Squabble Up" and "TV Off" (2024)	"Luther" (2024)

Music video
- "Squabble Up" on YouTube

GNX track listing
- 12 tracks: 1. "Wacced Out Murals"; 2. "Squabble Up"; 3. "Luther"; 4. "Man at the Garden"; 5. "Hey Now"; 6. "Reincarnated"; 7. "TV Off"; 8. "Dodger Blue"; 9. "Peekaboo"; 10. "Heart Pt. 6"; 11. "GNX"; 12. "Gloria"

"Squabble Up" (stylized in all lowercase) is a song by the American rapper Kendrick Lamar from his sixth studio album, GNX (2024). It was released alongside "TV Off" by PGLang and Interscope Records on November 26, 2024, as the first singles from the album. Lamar wrote "Squabble Up"; he produced the song with Sounwave, Jack Antonoff, and Ruchaun "Scott Bridgeway" Akers, with additional production by Matthew "M-Tech" Bernard. The track went viral on TikTok after being featured in promotional material for Mercedes AMG's Formula One campaign and during an NBA broadcast.

"Squabble Up" samples Debbie Deb's 1984 freestyle song "When I Hear Music". Music critics generally praised "Squabble Up" for its layered production and homage to various musical styles. The single became Lamar's fifth number-one song on the US Billboard Hot 100 chart. It peaked at number three on the Billboard Global 200 chart and was a top-five hit in Canada, Ireland, Latvia, New Zealand, South Africa, and the UK. An accompanying music video for "Squabble Up" was released on November 25, 2024. Lamar performed the song live at the Super Bowl LIX halftime show on February 9, 2025.

At the APRA Music Awards of 2026, the song was nominated for Most Performed International Work.

== Background and promotion ==
On July 4, 2024, Lamar released the music video of his diss track aimed at Canadian rapper Drake, titled "Not Like Us". He started out the video by adding a 20-second snippet of a then-untitled song, as he made his way down a dark hallway. Due to Lamar's use of the word 'broccoli' in the snippet, the song became subsequently known as "Broccoli" or "Broccoli (Reincarnated)". On October 13, the Formula One team of Mercedes AMG used the song to promote the forthcoming racing season. Only ten days later, the song was played during a National Basketball Association (NBA) broadcast of a Los Angeles Lakers and Minnesota Timberwolves game. All instances prompted the song to go viral on TikTok with fans asking for the full song to be released soon. The track was eventually released as the second track of Lamar's surprise-release sixth studio album, GNX, on November 22, 2024. On February 9, 2025, Lamar performed the song during the 2025 Super Bowl LIX halftime show. Following the Los Angeles Dodgers victory in the 2025 World Series against the Toronto Blue Jays, Nike used the song in the same credits style commercial they had used last year, referencing the feud.

== Composition ==
"Squabble Up"
The first 14 seconds sample of "Squabble Up" that showcases the hyphy-style beat along with lyrics of growth and renewal.

"Squabble Up" consists of a Moog synthesizer-driven groove. Pitchfork commented that "Squabble Up" borrows a "funky bassline" from the 1984 "classic '80s techno" freestyle song "When I Hear Music" by American singer-songwriter Debbie Deb. It sees the rapper channeling "elements of his California rap heritage", fusing "G-funk, hyphy, and even mariachi". His vocal performance includes using "myriad voices, octave changes, and shrieks". Lamar accuses other rappers of being fake without name-dropping any artist in particular. It observes themes of personal evolution, criticism from within the music industry as well as cultural commentary. In reference to his admiration for his work, Lamar mentions saxophonist Kamasi Washington, whom he collaborated with for GNX as well as To Pimp a Butterfly (2015).

== Critical reception ==
"Squabble Up" received critical acclaim. In a track review for Pitchfork, Matthew Ritchie praised Lamar for reshaping the Debbie Deb sample into a "'90s club hit" and found its broad lyrical targets made for a fun listen. Zachary Horvath of HotNewHipHop called it the most commercially appealing track on the album and cited its wordplay and personality as strengths.

GNX album reviews often singled out the track. Exclaim! described it as "by far the catchiest moment on the record," praising Lamar's handling of the Debbie Deb sample. Writing for Clash, Karl Blakesley placed it among the album's highlights and noted the force of Lamar's vocal performance. NME grouped it with other uptempo cuts on GNX, reading it as Lamar working in the G-funk tradition. The Ringer called it frenetic and freewheeling, arguing that its more technically ambitious passages came across as effortless.

Pitchfork's album review was less enthusiastic about the production, arguing the basslines were too clean for the style Lamar was aiming for, and that they should have carried more weight.

== Music video ==
Lamar holds a "Jesus Saves Gangsters Too!" sign in the music video, referencing the Los Angeles-based outreach ministry; the green-walled set is modeled after the Roots' 1999 video for "The Next Movement"

A music video directed by Calmatic was released on November 25, 2024. The set and cinematography pay homage to the music video of "The Next Movement", from the Roots' album Things Fall Apart (1999). The video contains heavy symbolism and multiple Easter eggs celebrating Black culture and West Coast hip-hop.

The video references several musical acts and albums. Lamar pays tribute to the late rapper Nate Dogg, with his G-Funk Classics, Vol. 1 & 2 album visible in the clip. A man dressed in the same clothing depicted on the cover of Isaac Hayes' 1971 album Black Moses appears in the video. Ice-T's 1988 album Power is evoked through a woman holding a shotgun, mirroring the album's cover art. The video also incorporates the Soul Train Scramble Board and features a nod to scraper bike culture through the "ThatGO" bike from the Trunk Boiz's 2007 video "Scraper Bike."

Several cultural and political references are woven throughout the video. The African-American Flag and imagery associated with the Black Panther Party appear, invoking themes of Black identity and political advocacy. The "Jesus Saves Gangsters Too!" initiative, a Los Angeles-based outreach ministry, is referenced when Lamar holds a sign bearing the phrase. A Compton Christmas Parade banner features in the clip. A 105 Freeway exit sign, taken from the road near Compton, is also displayed throughout the video.

The 1993 film Menace II Society is referenced by an actor portraying the film's orange-jacketed boy on a tricycle. Style icon and Sa-Ra Creative Partners member Taz Arnold appears in the video, holding up "Hood Love" four-finger rings; an allusion to the character of Radio Raheem in Spike Lee's 1989 film Do the Right Thing. At one point, Lamar is seen sitting and reading a book titled "How to Be More Like Kendrick for Dummies." The video features choreographed dance numbers by Charm La'Donna.

== Personnel ==
Credits are adapted from Tidal.

- Kendrick Lamar – vocals, producer
- Sounwave – producer
- Scott Bridgeway – producer
- Jack Antonoff – producer, engineer
- M-Tech – additional production
- Tony Butler – songwriter (sample)
- Sam Dew – background vocals
- Ink – background vocals
- Dani Perez – engineer
- Jack Manning – engineer
- Johnathan Turner – engineer
- Laura Sisk – engineer
- Ray Charles Brown Jr. – engineer
- Sebastian Owen Jones – engineer
- Oli Jacobs – engineer, mixing
- Eric Eylands – assistant engineer
- Joey Miller – assistant engineer
- John Armstrong – assistant engineer
- Jon Sher – assistant engineer
- Jozef Caldwell – assistant engineer
- Ruairi O'Flaherty – mastering

== Charts ==
=== Weekly charts ===
Weekly chart performance for "Squabble Up"
Chart (2024–2025)	Peak position
Australia (ARIA)	9
Australia Hip Hop/R&B (ARIA)	2
Austria (Ö3 Austria Top 40)	44
Canada Hot 100 (Billboard)	3
Czech Republic Singles Digital (ČNS IFPI)	93
Finland (Suomen virallinen lista)	46
France (SNEP)	53
Germany (GfK)	92
Global 200 (Billboard)	3
Greece International (IFPI)	2
India International (IMI)	13
Ireland (IRMA)	3
Israel (Mako Hitlist)	76
Italy (FIMI)	63
Latvia Streaming (LaIPA)	2
Lithuania (AGATA)	7
Lithuania Airplay (TopHit)	117
Luxembourg (Billboard)	19
Netherlands (Single Top 100)	16
New Zealand (Recorded Music NZ)	4
Norway (VG-lista)	25
Philippines (Philippines Hot 100)	80
Poland (Polish Streaming Top 100)	38
Portugal (AFP)	7
Singapore (RIAS)	30
Slovakia Singles Digital (ČNS IFPI)	53
South Africa Streaming (TOSAC)	4
Sweden (Sverigetopplistan)	26
Switzerland (Schweizer Hitparade)	17
UK Singles (Official Charts)	4
UK Hip Hop/R&B (Official Charts)	1
US Billboard Hot 100	1
US Hot R&B/Hip-Hop Songs (Billboard)	1
US Pop Airplay (Billboard)	25
US R&B/Hip-Hop Airplay (Billboard)	8
US Rhythmic Airplay (Billboard)	1

=== Year-end charts ===
Year-end chart performance for "Squabble Up"
Chart (2025)	Position
Canada (Canadian Hot 100)	65
Global 200 (Billboard)	95
US Billboard Hot 100	20
US Hot R&B/Hip-Hop Songs (Billboard)	7
US R&B/Hip-Hop Airplay (Billboard)	12
US Rhythmic Airplay (Billboard)	5

== Certifications ==
Certifications for "Squabble Up"
Region	Certification	Certified units/sales
Australia (ARIA)	Platinum	70,000^{‡}
Brazil (Pro-Música Brasil)	Platinum	40,000^{‡}
New Zealand (RMNZ)	Platinum	30,000^{‡}
Portugal (AFP)	Gold	5,000^{‡}
United Kingdom (BPI)	Silver	200,000^{‡}
Streaming
Greece (IFPI Greece)	Gold	1,000,000^{†}
^{‡} Sales+streaming figures based on certification alone.^{†} Streaming-only figures based on certification alone.

== Release history ==
Release dates and formats for "Squabble Up"
Region	Date	Format(s)	Label(s)	Ref.
United States	November 26, 2024	Rhythmic crossover	PGLang; Interscope	
United States	December 3, 2024	Contemporary hit radio	PGLang; Interscope	
