= Luther (song) =

2024 single by Kendrick Lamar and SZA

Single by Kendrick Lamar and SZA

from the album GNX
- Released: November 29, 2024
- Genre: R&B; hip-hop
- Length: 2:57
- Label: PGLang; Interscope
- Songwriters: Kendrick Duckworth; Solána Rowe; Atia Boggs; Samuel Dew; Scott Bridgeway; Mark Spears; Jack Antonoff; Kamasi Washington; Matthew Bernard; Roshwita Larisha Bacha; Marvin Gaye
- Producers: Sounwave; Antonoff; Bridgeway; Washington; M-Tech; roselilah

Kendrick Lamar singles chronology
"Squabble Up" and "TV Off" (2024)	"Luther" (2024)	"30 for 30" (2025)

SZA singles chronology
"Saturn" (2024)	"Luther" (2024)	"BMF" and "30 for 30" (2025)

Music video
- "Luther" on YouTube

"Luther" (stylized in all lowercase) is a song by American rapper Kendrick Lamar and American singer-songwriter SZA. Titled after the American R&B and soul singer Luther Vandross, the track contains a sample of Vandross and Cheryl Lynn's 1982 rendition of "If This World Were Mine", originally performed by Marvin Gaye and Tammi Terrell. "Luther" was released as the third single from Lamar's sixth studio album, GNX, on November 29, 2024, through PGLang and Interscope Records.

"Luther" was written by Lamar, SZA, Ink, and Sam Dew; it was produced by Sounwave, Jack Antonoff, Ruchaun "Scott Bridgeway" Akers, Kamasi Washington, Matthew "M-Tech" Bernard, and Roshwita Larisha "roselilah" Bacha. An R&B and hip-hop love ballad with influences of 1980s R&B and freestyle music, "Luther" features Lamar and SZA's vocal harmonies against 808 drums, hi-hats, and an orchestral arrangement. Its lyrics are about imagining a better future for one's loved ones.

Music critics lauded "Luther" for the vocal chemistry between Lamar and SZA; many reviews highlighted it as a tender and heartfelt track compared to GNX's boastful other songs. The single spent 13 consecutive weeks at number one on the US Billboard Hot 100 chart, making it Lamar and SZA's longest-charting number one song on the chart, as well as the second longest-running hip-hop song of all time on the Hot 100, behind Lil Nas X's "Old Town Road". It also peaked at number one in New Zealand, the Philippines, Singapore, and South Africa; at number three on the Billboard Global 200 chart; and in the top 10 in many countries including in Australia, Canada, Portugal, and the UK.

Lamar and SZA first performed "Luther" live at the Super Bowl LIX halftime show on February 9, 2025. At the 68th Grammy Awards, "Luther" won Record of the Year and Best Melodic Rap Performance, and was additionally nominated for Song of the Year. It was also Billboard magazine's number-one song on both their 2025 Year-End Hot Rap Songs chart and their Year-End R&B/Hip-Hop chart.

== Composition ==
"Luther" is a love ballad that combines contemporary R&B and hip-hop with elements of 1980s R&B and freestyle music. The lyrics are about imagining a better future for one's beloveds. The track begins with classical guitar riffs and a vocal sample of Luther Vandross and Cheryl Lynn's 1982 rendition of "If This World Were Mine", originally performed by Marvin Gaye and Tammi Terrell. After the sample, Lamar delivers his first verse in a monotone, pauses with repeated "fa"s, then continues his second verse, which is accentuated by double vocal tracking and an orchestral swell. The chorus features Lamar and SZA harmonizing together, with SZA's vocals being layered on top of Lamar's, against accentuations of 808 drums and hi-hats.

== Music video ==
A concept art music video for the song was released on April 11, 2025, directed by Canadian director and actress Karena Evans. It stars both Lamar and SZA, along with Nigerian-American musician, visual artist and model Annahstasia Enuke playing Lamar's love interest, while model Geron McKinley plays SZA's respective love interest. Most of the scenes were shot on location of the Westin Bonaventure Hotel in Los Angeles, as well as the Brandeis-Bardin Campus of American Jewish University and its House of the Book, in the Simi Hills of the Simi Valley, in California, the same shooting location where the one-minute teaser for GNX was filmed. The song pauses throughout the video to play the original sample of "If This World Were Mine", and the video's final minute consists of Vandross' first verse playing uninterrupted. The video won the 2025 NAACP Image Award for Outstanding Music Video and the 2026 Juno Award for Video of the Year.

== Critical reception ==
The song received widespread critical acclaim. Writing for NME, Kyann-Sian Williams thought the song was yet another demonstration of the duo's "chart-topping chemistry" and praised their "debonair" take on a "traditional love ballad". Lindsay Zoladz at The New York Times called "Luther" a notably "tender moment" and "three-minute pause" from an otherwise boastful album. Tomás Mier of Rolling Stone noted Lamar for "stretching his singing chops" before being joined by SZA. The song was nominated for three Grammy Awards in 2026, winning two for Record of the Year and Best Melodic Rap Performance.

== Accolades ==
List of awards and nominations received by "Luther"
Year	Award	Category	Result	Ref.
2025	American Music Awards	Collaboration of the Year	Nominated	
2025	American Music Awards	Favorite Hip-Hop Song	Nominated	
2025	BET Awards	Viewer's Choice Award	Nominated	
2025	BET Awards	Best Collaboration	Won	
2025	Nickelodeon Kids' Choice Awards	Favorite Music Collaboration	Won	
2025	MTV Video Music Awards	Best Collaboration	Nominated	
2026	Grammy Awards	Record of the Year	Won	
2026	Grammy Awards	Song of the Year	Nominated	
2026	Grammy Awards	Best Melodic Rap Performance	Won	
2026	Juno Awards	Video of the Year	Won	
2026	BET Awards	Video of the Year	Nominated	

== Commercial performance ==
In New Zealand, "Luther" debuted at number one on the Official Aotearoa Music Charts, marking Lamar's fourth overall number-one single in the country, and his second for 2024. Following the Super Bowl LIX halftime show performance, "Luther" returned to the top spot and spent five consecutive weeks, totaling six weeks atop.

In the United States, "Luther" debuted at number three on the Billboard Hot 100, following the release of GNX. It re-entered the top ten on the chart dated January 11, 2025, at number seven. Starting at the issue date of January 25, 2025, "Luther" gradually climbed up each spot, until it finally reached number one on the chart dated March 1, 2025, becoming Lamar's sixth number-one hit and SZA's third. The song spent thirteen straight weeks at the summit of the chart, becoming both Lamar and SZA's longest-running chart-topper. The song finished at number two on the 2025 Billboard Hot 100 Year-End chart.

Lamar made history on the December 21, 2024, issue of Billboard by replacing himself at number one on the Hot R&B/Hip-Hop Songs chart with "Luther", becoming the first artist to achieve three consecutive number ones without interruption in the magazine's history. The single spent 31 nonconsecutive weeks at number one on the Hot R&B/Hip-Hop Songs chart, the longest reign in the chart's history. It likewise topped Hot Rap Songs for 47 weeks, also marking the longest-running number-one single to date on that ranking.

== Live performances ==
The duo performed "Luther" as part of Lamar's Super Bowl LIX halftime show performance in February 2025. Later in April, they began embarking on the co-headlining Grand National Tour, where they performed "Luther" as one of the concerts' final songs.

== Credits and personnel ==
- Kendrick Lamar – songwriter, composer, vocals
- SZA – songwriter, composer, guest vocals
- Sam Dew – songwriter, composer, additional vocals
- Ink – songwriter, composer
- Jack Antonoff – composer, recording, producer
- Scott Bridgeway – composer, producer
- roselilah – composer, producer
- M-Tech – composer, additional producer
- Ray Charles Brown, Jr – recording
- Oli Jacobs – recording, mixing
- Tony Austin – recording
- Laura Sisk – recording
- Jonathan Turner – recording
- Sounwave – composer, producer
- Kamasi Washington – composer, producer

== Charts ==
=== Weekly charts ===
Weekly chart performance
Chart (2024–2025)	Peak position
Australia (ARIA)	2
Australia Hip Hop/R&B (ARIA)	1
Austria (Ö3 Austria Top 40)	22
Belarus Airplay (TopHit)	48
Belgium (Ultratop 50 Flanders)	48
Belgium (Ultratop 50 Wallonia)	42
Canada Hot 100 (Billboard)	2
Canada CHR/Top 40 (Billboard)	2
CIS Airplay (TopHit)	29
Chile Anglo Airplay (Monitor Latino)	5
Colombia Anglo Airplay (Monitor Latino)	9
Czech Republic Singles Digital (ČNS IFPI)	62
Denmark (Tracklisten)	17
Dominican Republic Anglo Airplay (Monitor Latino)	4
France (SNEP)	45
Germany (GfK)	24
Global 200 (Billboard)	3
Greece International (IFPI)	9
Honduras Anglo Airplay (Monitor Latino)	4
Hong Kong (Billboard)	10
Iceland (Tónlistinn)	25
India International (IMI)	4
Indonesia (IFPI)	15
Ireland (IRMA)	7
Israel (Mako Hitlist)	41
Italy (FIMI)	67
Jamaica Airplay (JAMMS)	2
Japan Hot Overseas (Billboard Japan)	3
Kazakhstan Airplay (TopHit)	20
Latvia Streaming (LaIPA)	7
Lebanon (Lebanese Top 20)	6
Lithuania (AGATA)	5
Luxembourg (Billboard)	10
Malaysia (IFPI)	5
Malaysia International (RIM)	2
Mexico Anglo Airplay (Monitor Latino)	6
Netherlands (Single Top 100)	17
New Zealand (Recorded Music NZ)	1
Nicaragua Anglo Airplay (Monitor Latino)	4
Nigeria (TurnTable Top 100)	42
Norway (IFPI Norge)	22
Peru Anglo Airplay (Monitor Latino)	14
Philippines (Philippines Hot 100)	1
Poland (Polish Streaming Top 100)	40
Portugal (AFP)	4
Russia Airplay (TopHit)	25
San Marino Airplay (SMRTV Top 50)	35
Singapore (RIAS)	1
Slovakia Singles Digital (ČNS IFPI)	27
South Africa Streaming (TOSAC)	1
South Korea (Circle)	27
Spain (Promusicae)	75
Suriname (Nationale Top 40)	14
Sweden (Sverigetopplistan)	21
Switzerland (Schweizer Hitparade)	16
Taiwan (Billboard)	7
Turkey International Airplay (Radiomonitor Türkiye)	2
UK Singles (Official Charts)	4
UK Hip Hop/R&B (Official Charts)	1
US Billboard Hot 100	1
US Adult Pop Airplay (Billboard)	27
US Dance Airplay (Billboard)	28
US Hot R&B/Hip-Hop Songs (Billboard)	1
US Pop Airplay (Billboard)	1
US R&B/Hip-Hop Airplay (Billboard)	1
US Rhythmic Airplay (Billboard)	1
Vietnam (IFPI)	14

=== Monthly charts ===
Monthly chart performance
Chart (2024–2025)	Peak position
CIS Airplay (TopHit)	31
Kazakhstan Airplay (TopHit)	28
Lithuania Airplay (TopHit)	70
Russia Airplay (TopHit)	31
South Korea (Circle)	31

=== Year-end charts ===
Year-end chart performance
Chart (2025)	Position
Australia (ARIA)	13
Canada (Canadian Hot 100)	13
CIS Airplay (TopHit)	68
Global 200 (Billboard)	8
Iceland (Tónlistinn)	48
India International (IMI)	15
Kazakhstan Airplay (TopHit)	156
New Zealand (Recorded Music NZ)	6
Philippines (Philippines Hot 100)	3
Russia Airplay (TopHit)	89
South Korea (Circle)	81
UK Singles (OCC)	80
US Billboard Hot 100	2
US Hot R&B/Hip-Hop Songs (Billboard)	1
US Hot Rap Songs (Billboard)	1
US Hot R&B/Hip-Hop Airplay (Billboard)	2
US Pop Airplay (Billboard)	8
US Rhythmic Airplay (Billboard)	1

== Certifications ==
Certifications
Region	Certification	Certified units/sales
Australia (ARIA)	4× Platinum	280,000^{‡}
Belgium (BRMA)	Gold	20,000^{‡}
Brazil (Pro-Música Brasil)	Diamond	160,000^{‡}
Denmark (IFPI Danmark)	Gold	45,000^{‡}
France (SNEP)	Gold	100,000^{‡}
New Zealand (RMNZ)	4× Platinum	120,000^{‡}
Nigeria (TCSN)	Silver	25,000^{‡}
Portugal (AFP)	2× Platinum	20,000^{‡}
Spain (Promusicae)	Gold	50,000^{‡}
United Kingdom (BPI)	Platinum	600,000^{‡}
Streaming
Central America (CFC)	Gold	3,500,000^{†}
Greece (IFPI Greece)	Gold	1,000,000^{†}
^{‡} Sales+streaming figures based on certification alone.^{†} Streaming-only figures based on certification alone.

== Release history ==
Release dates and formats
Region	Date	Format(s)	Label(s)	Ref.
Italy	November 29, 2024	Radio airplay	Universal	
United States	December 10, 2024	Contemporary hit radio	PGLang; Interscope	
United States	December 10, 2024	Rhythmic contemporary radio	PGLang; Interscope	
