= List of Billboard Global 200 number ones of 2025 =

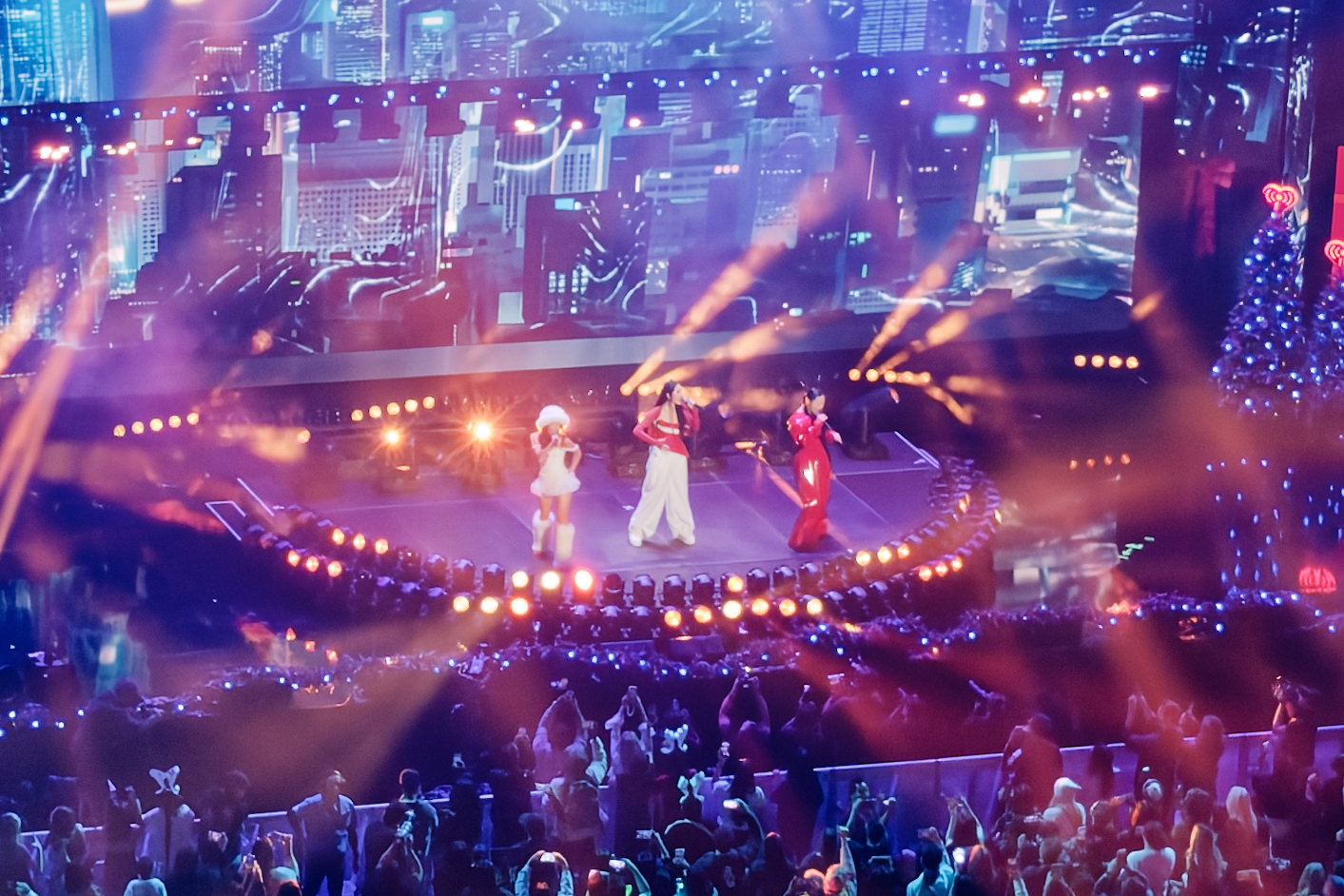
"Golden" by Huntrix (performers Rei Ami, Ejae and Audrey Nuna pictured) is the year's longest reigning number-one song, topping the Global 200 for 18 weeks and Global Excl. US for 19 weeks.

The Billboard Global 200 is a chart that ranks the best-performing songs globally. Its data, published by Billboard magazine and compiled by Luminate, is based on digital sales and online streaming from over 200 territories worldwide. Another similar chart is the Billboard Global Excl. US chart, which follows the same formula except it covers all territories excluding the US. The two charts launched on September 19, 2020.

On the Global 200, ten singles reached number one in 2025. Six artists reached the top of the chart for the first time—Alex Warren, Huntrix, Ejae, Audrey Nuna, Rei Ami and Wham!. Huntrix (Ejae, Audrey Nuna and Rei Ami) spent the most weeks at the top spot with 18 weeks at number one with their single "Golden", which is also the longest reigning number-one song.

On the Global Excl. US, eight singles reached number one in 2025. Six artists reached the top of the chart for the first time—Alex Warren, Huntrix, Ejae, Audrey Nuna, Rei Ami and Wham!. Bruno Mars and Huntrix (Ejae, Audrey Nuna and Rei Ami) spent the most weeks at the top spot with 19 weeks at number one. The former for his singles "APT." with Rosé and "Die with a Smile" with Lady Gaga and the latter for their single "Golden", which is also the longest reigning number-one song.

== Chart history ==
Key
†	Indicates best-performing song of 2025 on the Global 200
‡	Indicates best-performing song of 2025 on the Global Excl. US

Issue date	Billboard Global 200		Billboard Global Excl. US		Ref.
Issue date	Song	Artist(s)	Song	Artist(s)	Ref.
January 4	"All I Want for Christmas Is You"	Mariah Carey	"All I Want for Christmas Is You"	Mariah Carey	
January 11	"APT." †	Rosé and Bruno Mars	"APT." ‡	Rosé and Bruno Mars	
January 18	"APT." †	Rosé and Bruno Mars	"APT." ‡	Rosé and Bruno Mars	
January 25	"DTMF"	Bad Bunny	"APT." ‡	Rosé and Bruno Mars	
February 1	"DTMF"	Bad Bunny	"APT." ‡	Rosé and Bruno Mars	
February 8	"APT." †	Rosé and Bruno Mars	"APT." ‡	Rosé and Bruno Mars	
February 15	"Die with a Smile"	Lady Gaga and Bruno Mars	"APT." ‡	Rosé and Bruno Mars	
February 22	"Not Like Us"	Kendrick Lamar	"Die with a Smile"	Lady Gaga and Bruno Mars	
March 1	"Not Like Us"	Kendrick Lamar	"Die with a Smile"	Lady Gaga and Bruno Mars	
March 8	"Die with a Smile"	Lady Gaga and Bruno Mars	"APT." ‡	Rosé and Bruno Mars	
March 15	"Die with a Smile"	Lady Gaga and Bruno Mars	"APT." ‡	Rosé and Bruno Mars	
March 22	"Die with a Smile"	Lady Gaga and Bruno Mars	"Die with a Smile"	Lady Gaga and Bruno Mars	
March 29	"Die with a Smile"	Lady Gaga and Bruno Mars	"APT." ‡	Rosé and Bruno Mars	
April 5	"Die with a Smile"	Lady Gaga and Bruno Mars	"APT." ‡	Rosé and Bruno Mars	
April 12	"Die with a Smile"	Lady Gaga and Bruno Mars	"Die with a Smile"	Lady Gaga and Bruno Mars	
April 19	"Die with a Smile"	Lady Gaga and Bruno Mars	"Die with a Smile"	Lady Gaga and Bruno Mars	
April 26	"Die with a Smile"	Lady Gaga and Bruno Mars	"Die with a Smile"	Lady Gaga and Bruno Mars	
May 3	"Die with a Smile"	Lady Gaga and Bruno Mars	"Die with a Smile"	Lady Gaga and Bruno Mars	
May 10	"Ordinary"	Alex Warren	"Die with a Smile"	Lady Gaga and Bruno Mars	
May 17	"Ordinary"	Alex Warren	"Die with a Smile"	Lady Gaga and Bruno Mars	
May 24	"Ordinary"	Alex Warren	"Ordinary"	Alex Warren	
May 31	"Ordinary"	Alex Warren	"Ordinary"	Alex Warren	
June 7	"Ordinary"	Alex Warren	"Ordinary"	Alex Warren	
June 14	"Ordinary"	Alex Warren	"Ordinary"	Alex Warren	
June 21	"Ordinary"	Alex Warren	"Ordinary"	Alex Warren	
June 28	"Ordinary"	Alex Warren	"Ordinary"	Alex Warren	
July 5	"Ordinary"	Alex Warren	"Ordinary"	Alex Warren	
July 12	"Ordinary"	Alex Warren	"Ordinary"	Alex Warren	
July 19	"Golden"	Huntrix: Ejae, Audrey Nuna and Rei Ami	"Golden"	Huntrix: Ejae, Audrey Nuna and Rei Ami	
July 26	"Jump"	Blackpink	"Jump"	Blackpink	
August 2	"Golden"	Huntrix: Ejae, Audrey Nuna and Rei Ami	"Golden"	Huntrix: Ejae, Audrey Nuna and Rei Ami	
August 9	"Golden"	Huntrix: Ejae, Audrey Nuna and Rei Ami	"Golden"	Huntrix: Ejae, Audrey Nuna and Rei Ami	
August 16	"Golden"	Huntrix: Ejae, Audrey Nuna and Rei Ami	"Golden"	Huntrix: Ejae, Audrey Nuna and Rei Ami	
August 23	"Golden"	Huntrix: Ejae, Audrey Nuna and Rei Ami	"Golden"	Huntrix: Ejae, Audrey Nuna and Rei Ami	
August 30	"Golden"	Huntrix: Ejae, Audrey Nuna and Rei Ami	"Golden"	Huntrix: Ejae, Audrey Nuna and Rei Ami	
September 6	"Golden"	Huntrix: Ejae, Audrey Nuna and Rei Ami	"Golden"	Huntrix: Ejae, Audrey Nuna and Rei Ami	
September 13	"Golden"	Huntrix: Ejae, Audrey Nuna and Rei Ami	"Golden"	Huntrix: Ejae, Audrey Nuna and Rei Ami	
September 20	"Golden"	Huntrix: Ejae, Audrey Nuna and Rei Ami	"Golden"	Huntrix: Ejae, Audrey Nuna and Rei Ami	
September 27	"Golden"	Huntrix: Ejae, Audrey Nuna and Rei Ami	"Golden"	Huntrix: Ejae, Audrey Nuna and Rei Ami	
October 4	"Golden"	Huntrix: Ejae, Audrey Nuna and Rei Ami	"Golden"	Huntrix: Ejae, Audrey Nuna and Rei Ami	
October 11	"Golden"	Huntrix: Ejae, Audrey Nuna and Rei Ami	"Golden"	Huntrix: Ejae, Audrey Nuna and Rei Ami	
October 18	"The Fate of Ophelia"	Taylor Swift	"The Fate of Ophelia"	Taylor Swift	
October 25	"The Fate of Ophelia"	Taylor Swift	"The Fate of Ophelia"	Taylor Swift	
November 1	"Golden"	Huntrix: Ejae, Audrey Nuna and Rei Ami	"Golden"	Huntrix: Ejae, Audrey Nuna and Rei Ami	
November 8	"Golden"	Huntrix: Ejae, Audrey Nuna and Rei Ami	"Golden"	Huntrix: Ejae, Audrey Nuna and Rei Ami	
November 15	"Golden"	Huntrix: Ejae, Audrey Nuna and Rei Ami	"Golden"	Huntrix: Ejae, Audrey Nuna and Rei Ami	
November 22	"Golden"	Huntrix: Ejae, Audrey Nuna and Rei Ami	"Golden"	Huntrix: Ejae, Audrey Nuna and Rei Ami	
November 29	"Golden"	Huntrix: Ejae, Audrey Nuna and Rei Ami	"Golden"	Huntrix: Ejae, Audrey Nuna and Rei Ami	
December 6	"The Fate of Ophelia"	Taylor Swift	"The Fate of Ophelia"	Taylor Swift	
December 13	"Golden"	Huntrix: Ejae, Audrey Nuna and Rei Ami	"Golden"	Huntrix: Ejae, Audrey Nuna and Rei Ami	
December 20	"Last Christmas"	Wham!	"Golden"	Huntrix: Ejae, Audrey Nuna and Rei Ami	
December 27	"All I Want for Christmas Is You"	Mariah Carey	"Last Christmas"	Wham!	

== Number-one artists ==
List of number-one artists by total weeks at number one on Global 200
Position	Artist	Weeks at No. 1
1	Huntrix	18
1	Ejae	18
1	Audrey Nuna	18
1	Rei Ami	18
2	Bruno Mars	13
3	Lady Gaga	10
3	Alex Warren	10
4	Rosé	3
4	Taylor Swift	3
5	Bad Bunny	2
5	Kendrick Lamar	2
5	Mariah Carey	2
6	Blackpink	1
6	Wham!	1

List of number-one artists by total weeks at number one on Global Excl. US
Position	Artist	Weeks at No. 1
1	Bruno Mars	19
1	Huntrix	19
1	Ejae	19
1	Audrey Nuna	19
1	Rei Ami	19
2	Rosé	10
3	Lady Gaga	9
4	Alex Warren	8
5	Taylor Swift	3
6	Mariah Carey	1
6	Blackpink	1
6	Wham!	1

== See also ==
- 2025 in music
- List of Billboard 200 number-one albums of 2025
- List of Billboard Hot 100 number ones of 2025
