= Billboard Year-End Hot 100 singles of 2025 =

Ranking of recorded music

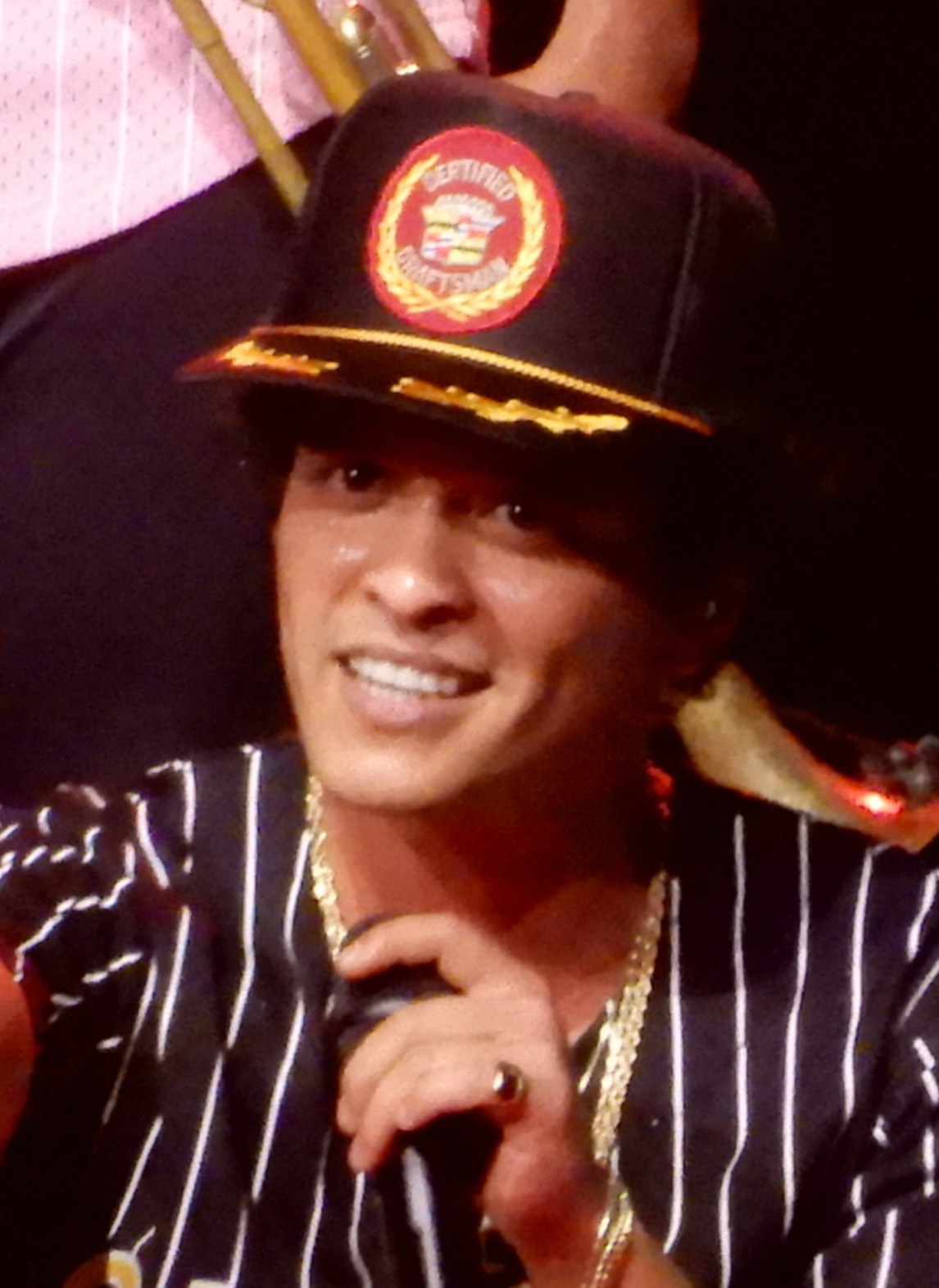
Two duets with Bruno Mars (pictured) rank within the top 10, with his Lady Gaga duet "Die with a Smile" coming in at number one, and his Rosé duet "APT." placing at number nine. The former made him the fourth act after the Beatles, George Michael and Elton John to top two Billboard Hot 100 Year-End lists, with his first being "Uptown Funk" in 2015.

The Billboard Hot 100 is a chart that ranks the best-performing singles of the United States. Its data, published by Billboard magazine and compiled by Nielsen SoundScan, is based collectively on each single's weekly physical and digital sales, as well as airplay and streaming. At the end of a year, Billboard will publish an annual list of the 100 most successful songs throughout that year on the Hot 100 chart based on the information. For 2025, the list was published on December 9, calculated with data from October 26, 2024, to October 18, 2025.

Four songs on this list ("A Bar Song (Tipsy)", "Lose Control", "Beautiful Things" and "I Had Some Help") were listed within the top 10 for the second year in a row, making 2025 the year with the most songs to achieve this feat.

== Year-end list ==
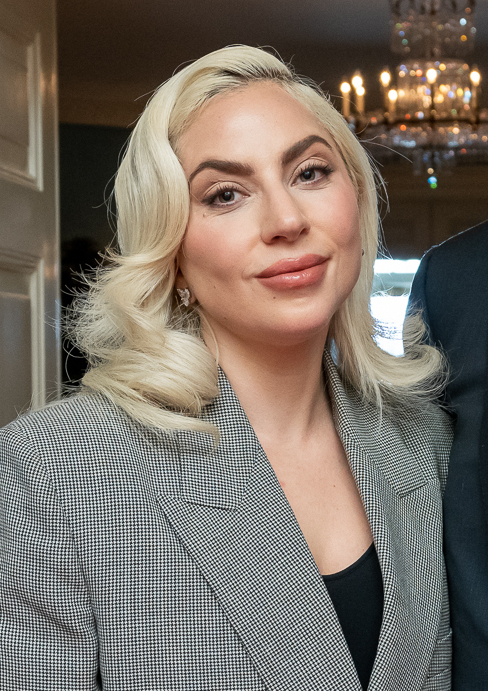
Lady Gaga's (pictured) sixth studio album, Mayhem, spawned two singles that appear on the list, with "Die with a Smile" ranking at number one and "Abracadabra" coming in at number 56.

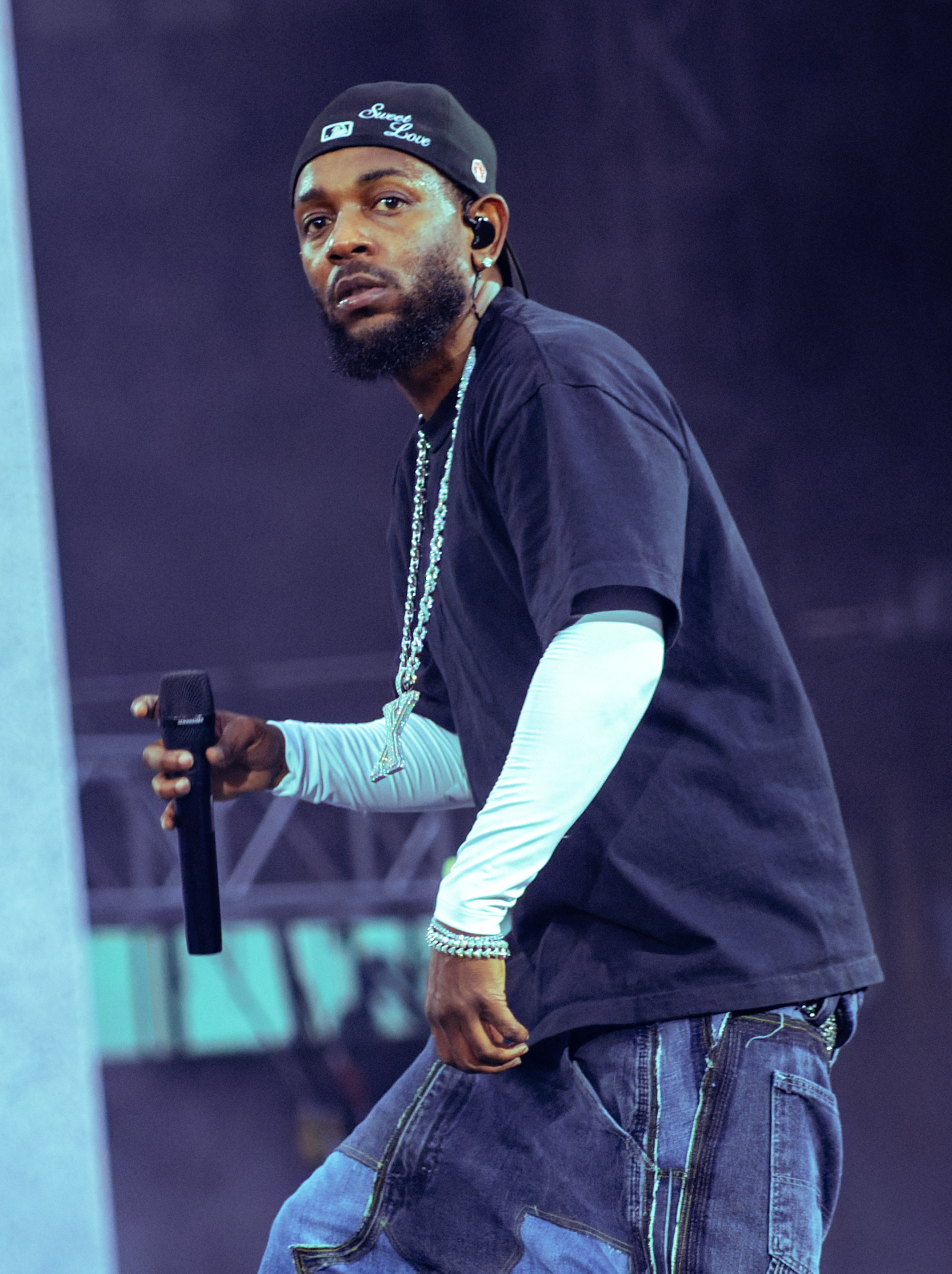
Kendrick Lamar (pictured) places six songs on the list, four of which came from his sixth studio album GNX, with his SZA duet "Luther" ranking the highest at number two.

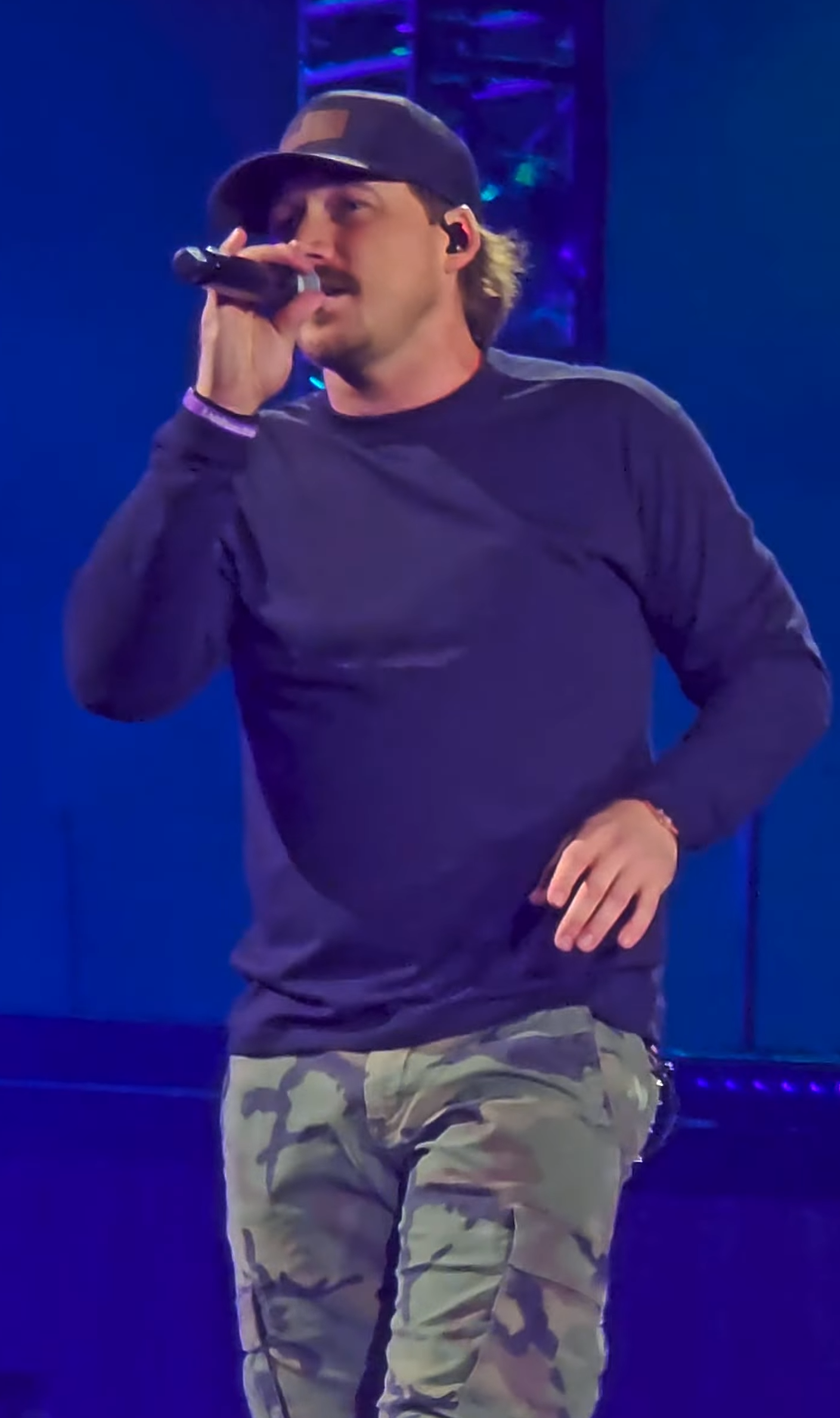
Ten songs from Morgan Wallen (pictured) land on the list, nine of which came from his fourth studio album I'm the Problem.

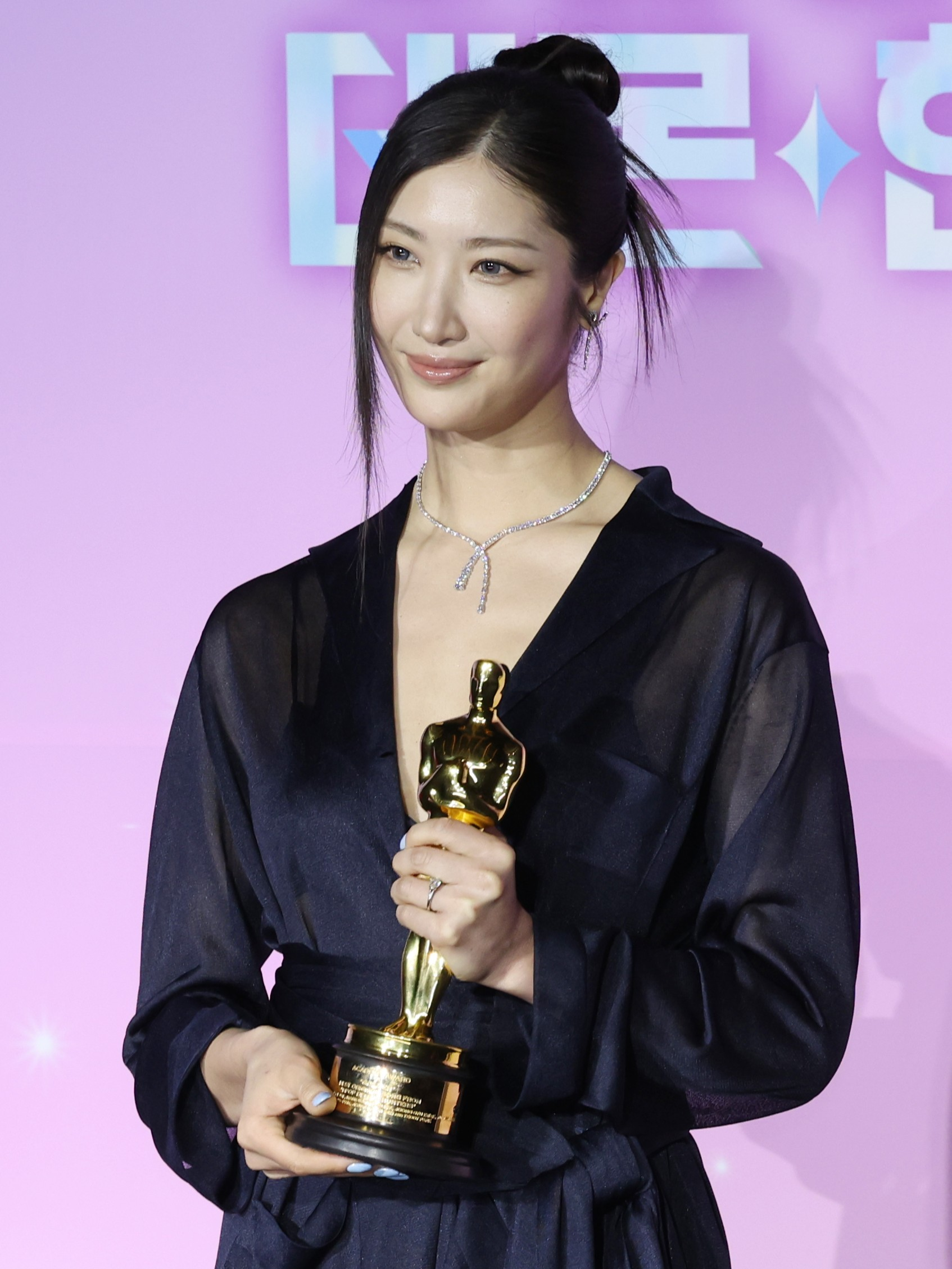
The KPop Demon Hunters soundtrack garnered seven placements on the list, four of which were co-written by Ejae (pictured), who also provides the singing voice for the film's protagonist and Huntrix member Rumi.

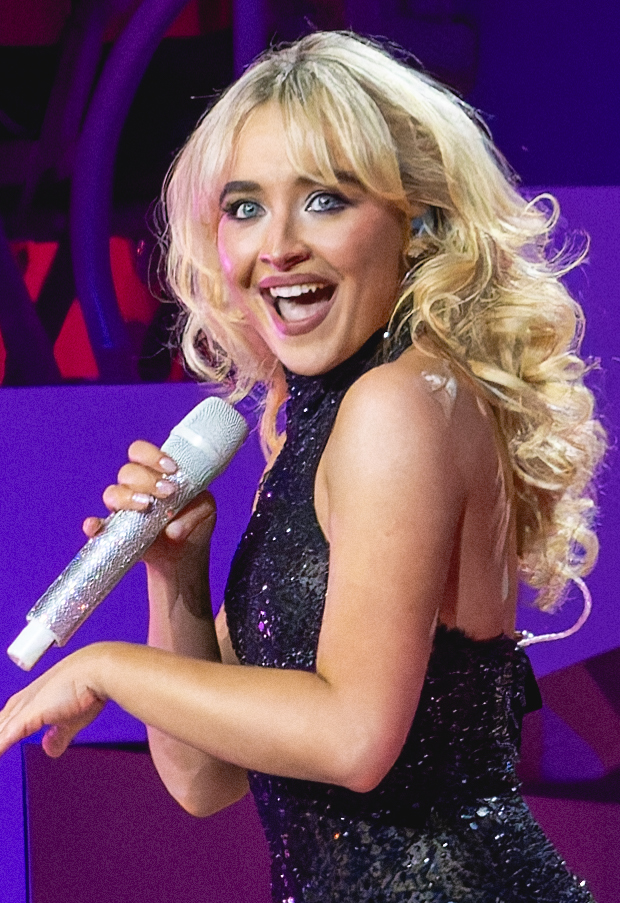
Sabrina Carpenter (pictured) makes five appearances on the list, with "Espresso" at number 12, "Taste" at number 19, "Manchild" at number 38, "Bed Chem" at number 45, and "Please Please Please" at number 50.

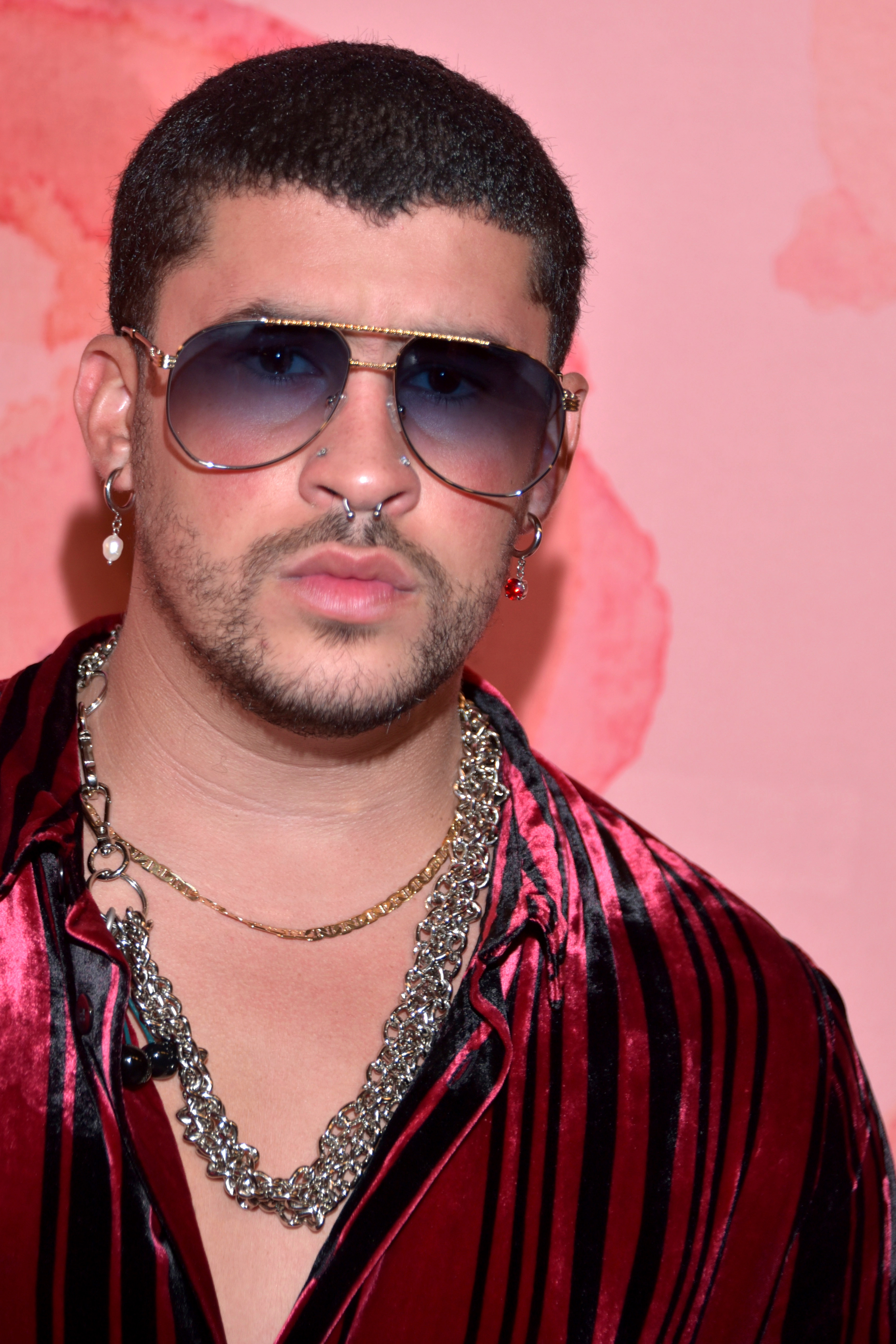
Four songs from Bad Bunny's (pictured) sixth solo studio album Debí Tirar Más Fotos appear on the list, with "DTMF", "Baile Inolvidable", "Eoo" and "Nuevayol" ranking at numbers 51, 70, 77 and 89 respectively.

List of songs on Billboard's 2025 Year-End Hot 100 chart
No.	Title	Artist(s)
1	"Die with a Smile"	Lady Gaga and Bruno Mars
2	"Luther"	Kendrick Lamar and SZA
3	"A Bar Song (Tipsy)"	Shaboozey
4	"Lose Control"	Teddy Swims
5	"Birds of a Feather"	Billie Eilish
6	"Beautiful Things"	Benson Boone
7	"Ordinary"	Alex Warren
8	"I Had Some Help"	Post Malone featuring Morgan Wallen
9	"APT."	Rosé and Bruno Mars
10	"Pink Pony Club"	Chappell Roan
11	"Love Somebody"	Morgan Wallen
12	"Espresso"	Sabrina Carpenter
13	"I'm the Problem"	Morgan Wallen
14	"That's So True"	Gracie Abrams
15	"TV Off"	Kendrick Lamar featuring Lefty Gunplay
16	"Timeless"	The Weeknd and Playboi Carti
17	"Not Like Us"	Kendrick Lamar
18	"Just in Case"	Morgan Wallen
19	"Taste"	Sabrina Carpenter
20	"Squabble Up"	Kendrick Lamar
21	"30 for 30"	SZA and Kendrick Lamar
22	"Mutt"	Leon Thomas
23	"Good News"	Shaboozey
24	"Nokia"	Drake
25	"Golden"	Huntrix: Ejae, Audrey Nuna and Rei Ami
26	"Wildflower"	Billie Eilish
27	"What I Want"	Morgan Wallen featuring Tate McRae
28	"Messy"	Lola Young
29	"Stargazing"	Myles Smith
30	"Love Me Not"	Ravyn Lenae
31	"Good Luck, Babe!"	Chappell Roan
32	"No One Noticed"	The Marías
33	"All the Way"	BigXthaPlug featuring Bailey Zimmerman
34	"Too Sweet"	Hozier
35	"Worst Way"	Riley Green
36	"Sailor Song"	Gigi Perez
37	"Sorry I'm Here for Someone Else"	Benson Boone
38	"Manchild"	Sabrina Carpenter
39	"Anxiety"	Doechii
40	"I Got Better"	Morgan Wallen
41	"Sticky"	Tyler, the Creator featuring GloRilla, Sexyy Red and Lil Wayne
42	"Undressed"	Sombr
43	"I Never Lie"	Zach Top
44	"Back to Friends"	Sombr
45	"Bed Chem"	Sabrina Carpenter
46	"Sports Car"	Tate McRae
47	"Mystical Magical"	Benson Boone
48	"Whatchu Kno About Me"	GloRilla and Sexyy Red
49	"Indigo"	Sam Barber featuring Avery Anna
50	"Please Please Please"	Sabrina Carpenter
51	"DTMF"	Bad Bunny
52	"Blue Strips"	Jessie Murph
53	"Peekaboo"	Kendrick Lamar featuring AzChike
54	"Your Idol"	Saja Boys: Andrew Choi, Neckwav, Danny Chung, Kevin Woo and Samuil Lee
55	"High Road"	Koe Wetzel featuring Jessie Murph
56	"Abracadabra"	Lady Gaga
57	"Who"	Jimin
58	"Burning Blue"	Mariah the Scientist
59	"All I Want for Christmas Is You"	Mariah Carey
60	"Daisies"	Justin Bieber
61	"Soda Pop"	Saja Boys: Andrew Choi, Neckwav, Danny Chung, Kevin Woo and Samuil Lee
62	"Like Him"	Tyler, the Creator featuring Lola Young
63	"Residuals"	Chris Brown
64	"Smile"	Morgan Wallen
65	"Last Christmas"	Wham!
66	"Am I Okay?"	Megan Moroney
67	"Rockin' Around the Christmas Tree"	Brenda Lee
68	"How It's Done"	Huntrix: Ejae, Audrey Nuna and Rei Ami
69	"Happen to Me"	Russell Dickerson
70	"Baile Inolvidable"	Bad Bunny
71	"Weren't for the Wind"	Ella Langley
72	"I Ain't Comin' Back"	Morgan Wallen featuring Post Malone
73	"Cry for Me"	The Weeknd
74	"Bad Dreams"	Teddy Swims
75	"Denial Is a River"	Doechii
76	"BMF"	SZA
77	"Eoo"	Bad Bunny
78	"I'm Gonna Love You"	Cody Johnson and Carrie Underwood
79	"I Am Not Okay"	Jelly Roll
80	"Backup Plan"	Bailey Zimmerman and Luke Combs
81	"Jingle Bell Rock"	Bobby Helms
82	"Revolving Door"	Tate McRae
83	"What It Sounds Like"	Huntrix: Ejae, Audrey Nuna and Rei Ami
84	"Hard Fought Hallelujah"	Brandon Lake and Jelly Roll
85	"Somebody Loves Me"	PartyNextDoor and Drake
86	"Liar"	Jelly Roll
87	"Tu Boda"	Óscar Maydon and Fuerza Regida
88	"After All the Bars Are Closed"	Thomas Rhett
89	"Nuevayol"	Bad Bunny
90	"20 Cigarettes"	Morgan Wallen
91	"Rather Lie"	Playboi Carti and the Weeknd
92	"Free"	Ejae and Andrew Choi
93	"Takedown"	Huntrix: Ejae, Audrey Nuna and Rei Ami
94	"Heart of a Woman"	Summer Walker
95	"House Again"	Hudson Westbrook
96	"Dark Thoughts"	Lil Tecca
97	"No Pole"	Don Toliver
98	"Folded"	Kehlani
99	"Superman"	Morgan Wallen
100	"Loco"	Netón Vega

== See also ==
- 2025 in American music
- Billboard Year-End Hot R&B/Hip-Hop Songs of 2025
- Billboard Year-End Hot Rap Songs of 2025
- List of Billboard Hot 100 number ones of 2025
- List of Billboard Hot 100 top-ten singles in 2025
