= Drop Dead =

Single by Olivia Rodrigo

from the album You Seem Pretty Sad for a Girl So in Love
- B-side: "Drop Dead" (karaoke version)
- Released: April 17, 2026
- Genre: Synth-pop; chamber pop; indie pop; pop rock; soft rock
- Length: 3:44
- Label: Geffen
- Songwriters: Olivia Rodrigo; Amy Allen; Dan Nigro
- Producer: Dan Nigro

Olivia Rodrigo singles chronology
| "Obsessed" (2024) | "Drop Dead" (2026) | "The Cure" (2026) |

Music video
- "Drop Dead" on YouTube

"Drop Dead" (stylized in all lowercase) is a song by American singer-songwriter Olivia Rodrigo, released on April 17, 2026, by Geffen Records as the lead single from her third studio album, You Seem Pretty Sad for a Girl So in Love (2026). Rodrigo wrote it with Amy Allen and its producer, Dan Nigro. "Drop Dead" has been described as a synth-pop, chamber pop, indie pop, pop rock, and soft rock song by critics, with instrumentation consisting of synthesizers, violins, and violas.

"Drop Dead" topped the charts in Australia, Canada, Ireland, the United Kingdom, the United States, and on the Billboard Global 200, and reached the top ten within Austria, Germany, the Netherlands, New Zealand, the Philippines, Portugal, Singapore, Switzerland, and the United Arab Emirates. It marked her fourth number-one on the Billboard Hot 100, making Rodrigo the first artist in history to debut the lead singles from their first three studio albums at the top of the chart. Rodrigo included "Drop Dead" on the set list of the Unraveled Tour (2026–2027).

== Background and release ==
In March 2026, Olivia Rodrigo described the thematic direction of her third studio album in an interview with British Vogue. She stated that the album predominantly features "sad love songs", explaining that many of her favorite romantic tracks derive their appeal from an undercurrent of fear or longing. On April 2, 2026, the album title was unveiled after being painted on a pink wall in Los Angeles and hinted with the final word in the album title in many cities. The single continues Rodrigo's collaboration with Dan Nigro, who returned to be the album's producer.

Beginning the promotional campaign, Rodrigo's team placed pink padlocks in American cities like Los Angeles and Hoboken, as well as Paris and London. These locks came together to form the words "April 17th drop dead". Rodrigo announced the song "Drop Dead" as the lead single from the album through her social media accounts on April 7, 2026, unveiling the date teased by the locks as the release date. The single cover features Rodrigo blowing a bubble with a piece of gum while wearing a white shirt bearing the song title. She put out a snippet of it on her social media platforms two days later, which did not include any vocals. It featured "a mix of fluttery, percussive synths" according to Billboard's Hannah Dailey, playing over a clip of Rodrigo seated in a pub and laughing after drinking one of three glasses of Guinness kept on the table in front of her. Pink-colored text stating: "I hope you never finish that beer" was overlaid on the clip and the words "super sweet" appeared on a button on her coat. The track was released on digital media as well as physical formats such as 7-inch, cassette, and CD.

On June 25th, 2026, Drop Dead was added as a Jam Track to Fortnite Festival, along with "Maggots for Brains" and "Deja Vu", as part of Rodrigo's collaboration with Fortnite.

== Composition ==
"Drop Dead" runs for 3 minutes and 44 seconds. It is a synth-pop, (Note: Attributed to multiple references:) chamber pop, indie pop, pop rock, and trippy soft rock song, with a new wave beat, a rock bridge, and a power pop guitar solo. Joel Calfee of Harper's Bazaar has called the song a "pulsing, synth-heavy track that strays from the more rock-leaning music of her past". Rodrigo included the lyric "You know all the words to 'Just Like Heaven'", referencing the Cure's 1987 single; the lyric had previously appeared on the cover of Live from Glastonbury (A BBC Recording) (2025). The song also incorporates string instruments, specifically violin and viola by Paul Cartwright. The lyrics focus on the start of a new romance, and the happiness found in it, which would further continue into "Stupid Song".

== Critical reception ==
"Drop Dead" received positive reviews from music critics. Laura Snapes's review for The Guardian noted that, although the song's title suggested a "punky kiss-off" akin to "Get Him Back!" (2023) or "Good 4 U" (2021) ahead of release, "Drop Dead" proved to be a "true pivot" for Rodrigo. Snapes compared it to the work of another frequent collaborator of Nigro's, Chappell Roan: "a whack of strings so maximalist it's one bauble short of festive; Rodrigo hanging out in her highest vocal register for the entire chorus, anticipation incarnate". She further labeled the song's "melodic vocal bends" as "undeniably Swiftian"—referring to American singer-songwriter Taylor Swift—concluding that the song is "so good [the comparison] doesn't really matter".

Megan Lapierre of Exclaim! also identified a Swift influence but argued that "Drop Dead" exhibited more the "cut-and-copy, paint-by-numbers pop hit" styling of Wolf Alice's "Don't Delete the Kisses" (2017). Though Lapierre found the song "refreshing" in Rodrigo's discography, she concluded that its emotional payoff "doesn't feel nearly as intense" as her previous works. Paolo Ragusa of Consequence also identified similarities between the "intimate, spoken-word cadence" of Rodrigo's second verse and the structure of "Don't Delete the Kisses".

== Commercial performance ==
=== United States ===
In the United States, "Drop Dead" debuted at number one on the Billboard Hot 100 chart issued May 2, 2026, becoming the fourth number-one single of Rodrigo's career. Already being the first artist ever to debut the lead singles from their first two studio albums at the spot, Rodrigo extended this milestone with her third studio album. The song was also the first with the word "dead" in its title to top the chart in its history. It also drew 27.9 million official streams, 23.8 million radio ariplay audience impressions and sold 45,000 copies in its first week.

Following its number-one debut, it helped Rodrigo's previous albums, Sour (2021) and Guts (2023), re-enter the Billboard 200; it also helped releases by the Cure re-enter the Billboard charts due to a reference in the song's lyrics. It topped the Billboard Pop Airplay chart dated August 29, becoming her third number-one hit.

=== Other markets ===
It debuted at number one on the Billboard Global 200. According to Luminate data the song drew 67.7 million streams and sold 41,000 downloads globally.

In Canada, the song entered at number one on the Canadian Hot 100. In the United Kingdom, it debuted atop the UK Singles Chart and received a platinum certification from the British Phonographic Industry. It also became her fourth number-one hit in the country, dethroning Sam Fender and Olivia Dean's "Rein Me In".

In Australia, "Drop Dead" debuted at number one and was certified gold by the Australian Recording Industry Association. It entered at number three in New Zealand and received a gold certification from Recorded Music NZ.

"Drop Dead" also peaked within the top ten at number one in Ireland, number two in Singapore, number three in Austria, the Netherlands, and Portugal, number four in Germany and Greece, number five in Hong Kong, and number six in Malaysia and Switzerland.

== Track listing ==
CD

- "Drop Dead"- 3:44
- "Drop Dead" (Karaoke version)

== Music video ==
The official music video for "Drop Dead" was released on April 17, 2026. Directed by frequent Rodrigo collaborator Petra Collins, it was primarily filmed at the Palace of Versailles, referencing the lyric that describes the singer's love interest as "lookin' like an angel on the walls of Versailles". Rodrigo's wardrobe in the music video includes a vintage Simone Baron minidress worn by Jane Birkin in the 1975 Parisian sex comedy Catherine & Co. The video also references the 2006 historical drama Marie Antoinette. The video was nominated for Best Pop Video at the 2026 MTV Video Music Awards.

The video starts with Rodrigo lounging in bed on her laptop, wrapped up in late-night internet stalking and obsessive daydreaming about a new crush. This is then followed by the "images of Rodrigo, running around [the Palace of Versailles] in retro pink over-ear headphones." She is then shown playing the guitar with two other girls in the background, while singing the bridge. Then she is shown running outside the palace as she sings the final chorus with the video ending.

== Live performances ==
On April 18, 2026, Rodrigo appeared at Coachella as a surprise special guest during Addison Rae's set, where they debuted the song live. On May 2, Rodrigo sang the song while hosting Saturday Night Live, introduced by Blondie lead vocalist Debbie Harry. On May 8, Rodrigo performed the song for Spotify's Billions Club Live concert series in Barcelona. She performed the concert in a Babydoll dress. This was later declared by Marie Claire as the "trend of the summer". It was included on the set list of the Unraveled Tour, which commenced on September 25 in Hartford, United States. Rodrigo as performed two one-off concerts in which both included the song in their setlist. The first one took place at the Echo in Los Angeles on April 24, 2026. The second One Night Only concert took place on August 6 at Warsaw in Brooklyn, New York, (Note: Attributed to The Guardian, The Brooklyn Paper, Stereogum, PIX 11, and NME.) in which it appeared as the opening song of the concert. Rodrigo also performed it in her surprise set at Primavera Sound.

== Accolades ==
Drop Dead has received 1 award nomination, for Best Pop at the 2026 MTV Video Music Awards.

== Personnel ==
These credits have been adapted from the liner notes of the CD single, as well as music streaming services Apple Music, Spotify, and Tidal.

- Olivia Rodrigo – songwriting, lead vocals, background vocals
- Amy Allen – songwriting
- Dan Nigro – songwriting, string arrangement, production, background vocals, piano, guitar, bass, drum programming, percussion, Mellotron
- Paul Cartwright – string arrangement, viola, violin
- Sterling Laws – drums
- Neal Pogue – audio mixing
- Brian Malouf – immersive audio mixing
- Mike Bozzi – audio mastering

== Charts ==
=== Weekly charts ===
Weekly chart performance
| Chart (2026) | Peak position |
|---|---|
| Argentina Hot 100 (Billboard) | 8 |
| Australia (ARIA) | 1 |
| Australia Airplay (RCS) | 4 |
| Austria (Ö3 Austria Top 40) | 3 |
| Belgium (Ultratop 50 Flanders) | 17 |
| Belgium (Ultratop 50 Wallonia) | 11 |
| Bolivia Airplay (Monitor Latino) | 3 |
| Brazil Hot 100 (Billboard) | 49 |
| Canada Hot 100 (Billboard) | 1 |
| Canada AC (Billboard) | 10 |
| Canada CHR/Top 40 (Billboard) | 1 |
| Canada Hot AC (Billboard) | 4 |
| Central America Anglo Airplay (Monitor Latino) | 10 |
| Chile Airplay (Monitor Latino) | 9 |
| Colombia Anglo Airplay (Monitor Latino) | 9 |
| CIS Airplay (TopHit) | 71 |
| Costa Rica Anglo Airplay (Monitor Latino) | 9 |
| Croatia (Billboard) | 19 |
| Croatia International Airplay (Top lista) | 4 |
| Czech Republic Airplay (ČNS IFPI) | 76 |
| Czech Republic Singles Digital (ČNS IFPI) | 10 |
| Denmark (Tracklisten) | 28 |
| Denmark Airplay (Tracklisten) | 2 |
| Dominican Republic Anglo Airplay (Monitor Latino) | 5 |
| Ecuador Anglo Airplay (Monitor Latino) | 8 |
| El Salvador Anglo Airplay (Monitor Latino) | 7 |
| Estonia Airplay (TopHit) | 3 |
| Finland Airplay (Radiosoittolista) | 49 |
| France (SNEP) | 40 |
| Germany (GfK) | 4 |
| Global 200 (Billboard) | 1 |
| Greece International (IFPI) | 4 |
| Guatemala Anglo Airplay (Monitor Latino) | 7 |
| Honduras Anglo Airplay (Monitor Latino) | 5 |
| Hong Kong (Billboard) | 5 |
| Hungary (Editors' Choice Top 40) | 16 |
| India International (IMI) | 6 |
| Indonesia (IFPI) | 11 |
| Ireland (IRMA) | 1 |
| Israel (Mako Hitlist) | 72 |
| Italy (FIMI) | 54 |
| Italy Airplay (EarOne) | 7 |
| Jamaica Airplay (JAMMS) | 10 |
| Japan Hot Overseas (Billboard Japan) | 4 |
| Latin America Anglo Airplay (Monitor Latino) | 5 |
| Latvia Airplay (LaIPA) | 1 |
| Latvia Streaming (LaIPA) | 15 |
| Lithuania (AGATA) | 56 |
| Lithuania Airplay (TopHit) | 22 |
| Luxembourg (Billboard) | 15 |
| Malaysia (IFPI) | 6 |
| Malaysia International (RIM) | 4 |
| Malta Airplay (Radiomonitor) | 9 |
| Mexico Anglo Airplay (Monitor Latino) | 2 |
| Middle East and North Africa (IFPI) | 10 |
| Netherlands (Dutch Top 40) | 22 |
| Netherlands (Single Top 100) | 3 |
| New Zealand (Recorded Music NZ) | 3 |
| Nicaragua Anglo Airplay (Monitor Latino) | 3 |
| Nigeria (TurnTable Top 100) | 93 |
| Nigeria Airplay (TurnTable) | 54 |
| Norway (VG-lista) | 26 |
| Panama International (PRODUCE) | 29 |
| Paraguay Airplay (Monitor Latino) | 10 |
| Peru Anglo Airplay (Monitor Latino) | 11 |
| Philippines Hot 100 (Billboard Philippines) | 3 |
| Poland Airplay (OLiS) | 17 |
| Poland Streaming (OLiS) | 19 |
| Portugal (AFP) | 3 |
| Puerto Rico Anglo Airplay (Monitor Latino) | 1 |
| Romania (Billboard) | 18 |
| Serbia Airplay (Radiomonitor) | 12 |
| Singapore (RIAS) | 2 |
| Slovakia Airplay (ČNS IFPI) | 16 |
| Slovakia Singles Digital (ČNS IFPI) | 14 |
| Slovenia Airplay (Radiomonitor) | 3 |
| Spain (Promusicae) | 14 |
| Spain Airplay (Promusicae) | 6 |
| South Africa Airplay (TOSAC) | 1 |
| South Africa Streaming (TOSAC) | 32 |
| Sweden (Sverigetopplistan) | 15 |
| Switzerland (Schweizer Hitparade) | 6 |
| Switzerland Airplay (MusicTrace) | 3 |
| Taiwan (Billboard) | 13 |
| United Arab Emirates (IFPI) | 7 |
| UK Singles (Official Charts) | 1 |
| Uruguay Anglo Airplay (Monitor Latino) | 4 |
| US Billboard Hot 100 | 1 |
| US Adult Contemporary (Billboard) | 15 |
| US Adult Pop Airplay (Billboard) | 2 |
| US Dance Airplay (Billboard) | 31 |
| US Pop Airplay (Billboard) | 1 |
| Venezuela Anglo Airplay (Monitor Latino) | 2 |

=== Monthly charts ===
Monthly chart performance
| Chart (2026) | Peak position |
|---|---|
| Estonia Airplay (TopHit) | 6 |
| Latvia Airplay (TopHit) | 34 |
| Lithuania Airplay (TopHit) | 30 |
| Paraguay Airplay (SGP) | 30 |

== Certifications ==
Certifications
| Region | Certification | Certified units/sales |
|---|---|---|
| Australia (ARIA) | Platinum | 70,000^{‡} |
| Belgium (BRMA) | Gold | 20,000^{‡} |
| Brazil (Pro-Música Brasil) | Platinum | 40,000^{‡} |
| Canada (Music Canada) | 2× Platinum | 160,000^{‡} |
| New Zealand (RMNZ) | Platinum | 30,000^{‡} |
| Portugal (AFP) | Platinum | 25,000^{‡} |
| Spain (Promusicae) | Gold | 50,000^{‡} |
| Switzerland (IFPI Switzerland) | Gold | 15,000^{‡} |
| United Kingdom (BPI) | Platinum | 600,000^{‡} |
^{‡} Sales+streaming figures based on certification alone.

== Release history ==
Release dates and format(s) for "Drop Dead"
| Region | Date | Format(s) | Label(s) | Ref. |
|---|---|---|---|---|
| Various | April 17, 2026 | 7-inch; cassette; CD; digital download; streaming | Geffen | |
| Italy | April 17, 2026 | Radio airplay | EMI | |
| United Kingdom | April 17, 2026 | Radio airplay | Polydor | |
| United States | April 20, 2026 | Hot adult contemporary radio | Geffen | |
| United States | April 21, 2026 | Contemporary hit radio | Geffen | |

== See also ==
- List of Billboard Hot 100 number ones of 2026
- List of Canadian Hot 100 number-one singles of 2026
- List of number-one singles of 2026 (Australia)
- List of Billboard Global 200 number ones of 2026
- List of number-one singles of 2026 (Ireland)
- List of UK Singles Chart number ones of the 2020s
