= List of Billboard Global 200 number ones of 2026 =

The Billboard Global 200 is a chart that ranks the best-performing songs globally. Its data, published by Billboard magazine and compiled by Luminate, is based on digital sales and online streaming from over 200 territories worldwide. Another similar chart is the Billboard Global Excl. US chart, which follows the same formula except it covers all territories excluding the US. The two charts launched on September 19, 2020.

On the Global 200, twenty singles reached number one in 2026 so far. Eight artists have reached the top of the chart for the first time—Djo, PinkPantheress, Zara Larsson, Nicki Minaj, Michael Jackson, Burna Boy, Judeline and Rusowsky.

On the Global Excl. US, fourteen singles reached number one in 2026 so far. Six artists have reached the top of the chart for the first time—PinkPantheress, Zara Larsson, Nicki Minaj, Burna Boy, Judeline and Rusowsky.

== Chart history ==
Issue date	Billboard Global 200		Billboard Global Excl. US		Ref.
Issue date	Song	Artist(s)	Song	Artist(s)	Ref.
January 3	"Last Christmas"	Wham!	"Last Christmas"	Wham!	
January 10	"The Fate of Ophelia"	Taylor Swift	"Golden"	Huntrix: Ejae, Audrey Nuna and Rei Ami	
January 17	"End of Beginning"	Djo	"The Fate of Ophelia"	Taylor Swift	
January 24	"The Fate of Ophelia"	Taylor Swift	"The Fate of Ophelia"	Taylor Swift	
January 31	"The Fate of Ophelia"	Taylor Swift	"The Fate of Ophelia"	Taylor Swift	
February 7	"Aperture"	Harry Styles	"The Fate of Ophelia"	Taylor Swift	
February 14	"The Fate of Ophelia"	Taylor Swift	"The Fate of Ophelia"	Taylor Swift	
February 21	"DTMF"	Bad Bunny	"DTMF"	Bad Bunny	
February 28	"DTMF"	Bad Bunny	"DTMF"	Bad Bunny	
March 7	"DTMF"	Bad Bunny	"DTMF"	Bad Bunny	
March 14	"Risk It All"	Bruno Mars	"DTMF"	Bad Bunny	
March 21	"American Girls"	Harry Styles	"American Girls"	Harry Styles	
March 28	"Stateside"	PinkPantheress and Zara Larsson	"Stateside"	PinkPantheress and Zara Larsson	
April 4	"Swim"	BTS	"Swim"	BTS	
April 11	"Swim"	BTS	"Swim"	BTS	
April 18	"Swim"	BTS	"Swim"	BTS	
April 25	"Swim"	BTS	"Swim"	BTS	
May 2	"Drop Dead"	Olivia Rodrigo	"Beauty and a Beat"	Justin Bieber featuring Nicki Minaj	
May 9	"Beauty and a Beat"	Justin Bieber featuring Nicki Minaj	"Beauty and a Beat"	Justin Bieber featuring Nicki Minaj	
May 16	"Beauty and a Beat"	Justin Bieber featuring Nicki Minaj	"Swim"	BTS	
May 23	"Billie Jean"	Michael Jackson	"Swim"	BTS	
May 30	"Janice STFU"	Drake	"Swim"	BTS	
June 6	"Janice STFU"	Drake	"Swim"	BTS	
June 13	"Hate That I Made You Love Me"	Ariana Grande	"Hate That I Made You Love Me"	Ariana Grande	
June 20	"I Knew It, I Knew You"	Taylor Swift	"Hate That I Made You Love Me"	Ariana Grande	
June 27	"Stupid Song"	Olivia Rodrigo	"Stupid Song"	Olivia Rodrigo	
July 4	"Stupid Song"	Olivia Rodrigo	"Dai Dai"	Shakira and Burna Boy	
July 11	"Hate That I Made You Love Me"	Ariana Grande	"Dai Dai"	Shakira and Burna Boy	
July 18	"Dai Dai"	Shakira and Burna Boy	"Dai Dai"	Shakira and Burna Boy	
July 25	"Dai Dai"	Shakira and Burna Boy	"Dai Dai"	Shakira and Burna Boy	
August 1	"Dai Dai"	Shakira and Burna Boy	"Dai Dai"	Shakira and Burna Boy	
August 8	"Dai Dai"	Shakira and Burna Boy	"Dai Dai"	Shakira and Burna Boy	
August 15	"Hate That I Made You Love Me"	Ariana Grande	"Dai Dai"	Shakira and Burna Boy	
August 22	"Dai Dai"	Shakira and Burna Boy	"Dai Dai"	Shakira and Burna Boy	
August 29	"Dai Dai"	Shakira and Burna Boy	"Dai Dai"	Shakira and Burna Boy	
September 5	"Dai Dai"	Shakira and Burna Boy	"Dai Dai"	Shakira and Burna Boy	
September 12	"Bby Wow"	Karol G, Judeline and Rusowsky	"Bby Wow"	Karol G, Judeline and Rusowsky	
September 19	"Bby Wow"	Karol G, Judeline and Rusowsky	"Bby Wow"	Karol G, Judeline and Rusowsky	
September 26	"Bby Wow"	Karol G, Judeline and Rusowsky	"Bby Wow"	Karol G, Judeline and Rusowsky	
October 3	"Bby Wow"	Karol G, Judeline and Rusowsky	"Bby Wow"	Karol G, Judeline and Rusowsky	
October 10	"Patient Zero"	Taylor Swift	"Patient Zero"	Taylor Swift	
October 17	"Bby Wow"	Karol G, Judeline and Rusowsky	"Bby Wow"	Karol G, Judeline and Rusowsky	
October 24	"Bby Wow"	Karol G, Judeline and Rusowsky	"Bby Wow"	Karol G, Judeline and Rusowsky	
October 31	"Housewife"	Tate McRae	"Housewife"	Tate McRae	
November 7	"Housewife"	Tate McRae	"Housewife"	Tate McRae	
November 14	"Housewife"	Tate McRae	"Housewife"	Tate McRae	
November 21	"Housewife"	Tate McRae	"Bby Wow"	Karol G, Judeline and Rusowsky	

== Number-one artists ==
List of number-one artists by total weeks at number one on the Global 200
Position	Artist	Weeks at No. 1
1	Shakira	7
1	Burna Boy	7
3	Taylor Swift	6
3	Karol G	6
3	Judeline	6
3	Rusowsky	6
7	BTS	4
7	Tate McRae	4
9	Bad Bunny	3
9	Olivia Rodrigo	3
9	Ariana Grande	3
12	Harry Styles	2
12	Justin Bieber	2
12	Nicki Minaj	2
12	Drake	2
16	Wham!	1
16	Djo	1
16	Bruno Mars	1
16	PinkPantheress	1
16	Zara Larsson	1
16	Michael Jackson	1

List of number-one artists by total weeks at number one on the Global Excl. US
Position	Artist	Weeks at No. 1
1	Shakira	10
1	Burna Boy	10
3	BTS	8
4	Karol G	7
4	Judeline	7
4	Rusowsky	7
7	Taylor Swift	6
8	Bad Bunny	4
9	Tate McRae	3
10	Justin Bieber	2
10	Nicki Minaj	2
10	Ariana Grande	2
13	Wham!	1
13	Huntrix	1
13	Ejae	1
13	Audrey Nuna	1
13	Rei Ami	1
13	Harry Styles	1
13	PinkPantheress	1
13	Zara Larsson	1
13	Olivia Rodrigo	1

== See also ==
- 2026 in music
- List of Billboard 200 number-one albums of 2026
- List of Billboard Hot 100 number ones of 2026
