= List of Canadian Hot 100 number-one singles of 2026 =

This is a list of the Canadian Hot 100 number-one singles of 2026. The Canadian Hot 100 is a chart that ranks the best-performing singles of Canada. Its data, published by Billboard magazine and compiled by Luminate, is based collectively on each single's weekly physical and digital sales, as well as airplay and streaming.

== Chart history ==
List of number-one songs
No.	Issue date	Song	Artist(s)	Ref.
re	January 3	"All I Want for Christmas Is You"	Mariah Carey	
re	January 10	"The Fate of Ophelia"	Taylor Swift	
re	January 17	"The Fate of Ophelia"	Taylor Swift	
re	January 24	"The Fate of Ophelia"	Taylor Swift	
re	January 31	"The Fate of Ophelia"	Taylor Swift	
re	February 7	"The Fate of Ophelia"	Taylor Swift	
215	February 14	"Man I Need"	Olivia Dean	
216	February 21	"DTMF"	Bad Bunny	
re	February 28	"Man I Need"	Olivia Dean	
re	March 7	"Man I Need"	Olivia Dean	
217	March 14	"I Just Might"	Bruno Mars	
re	March 21	"Man I Need"	Olivia Dean	
re	March 28	"Man I Need"	Olivia Dean	
re	April 4	"Man I Need"	Olivia Dean	
218	April 11	"Choosin' Texas"	Ella Langley	
218	April 18	"Choosin' Texas"	Ella Langley	
218	April 25	"Choosin' Texas"	Ella Langley	
219	May 2	"Drop Dead"	Olivia Rodrigo	
re	May 9	"Choosin' Texas"	Ella Langley	
re	May 16	"Choosin' Texas"	Ella Langley	
re	May 23	"Choosin' Texas"	Ella Langley	
220	May 30	"Janice STFU"	Drake	
220	June 6	"Janice STFU"	Drake	
220	June 13	"Janice STFU"	Drake	
221	June 20	"I Knew It, I Knew You"	Taylor Swift	
re	June 27	"Choosin' Texas"	Ella Langley	
re	July 4	"Choosin' Texas"	Ella Langley	
re	July 11	"Choosin' Texas"	Ella Langley	
re	July 18	"Choosin' Texas"	Ella Langley	
re	July 25	"Choosin' Texas"	Ella Langley	
re	August 1	"Choosin' Texas"	Ella Langley	
re	August 8	"Choosin' Texas"	Ella Langley	
re	August 15	"Choosin' Texas"	Ella Langley	
re	August 22	"Choosin' Texas"	Ella Langley	
re	August 29	"Choosin' Texas"	Ella Langley	
re	September 5	"Choosin' Texas"	Ella Langley	
re	September 12	"Choosin' Texas"	Ella Langley	
re	September 19	"Choosin' Texas"	Ella Langley	
re	September 26	"Choosin' Texas"	Ella Langley	
re	October 3	"Choosin' Texas"	Ella Langley	
222	October 10	"Patient Zero"	Taylor Swift	
re	October 17	"Choosin' Texas"	Ella Langley	
re	October 24	"Choosin' Texas"	Ella Langley	
223	October 31	"Housewife"	Tate McRae	
223	November 7	"Housewife"	Tate McRae	
223	November 14	"Housewife"	Tate McRae	
re	November 21	"Choosin' Texas"	Ella Langley	

== See also ==
- List of number-one albums of 2026 (Canada)
