= List of Billboard Hot 100 number ones of 2026 =

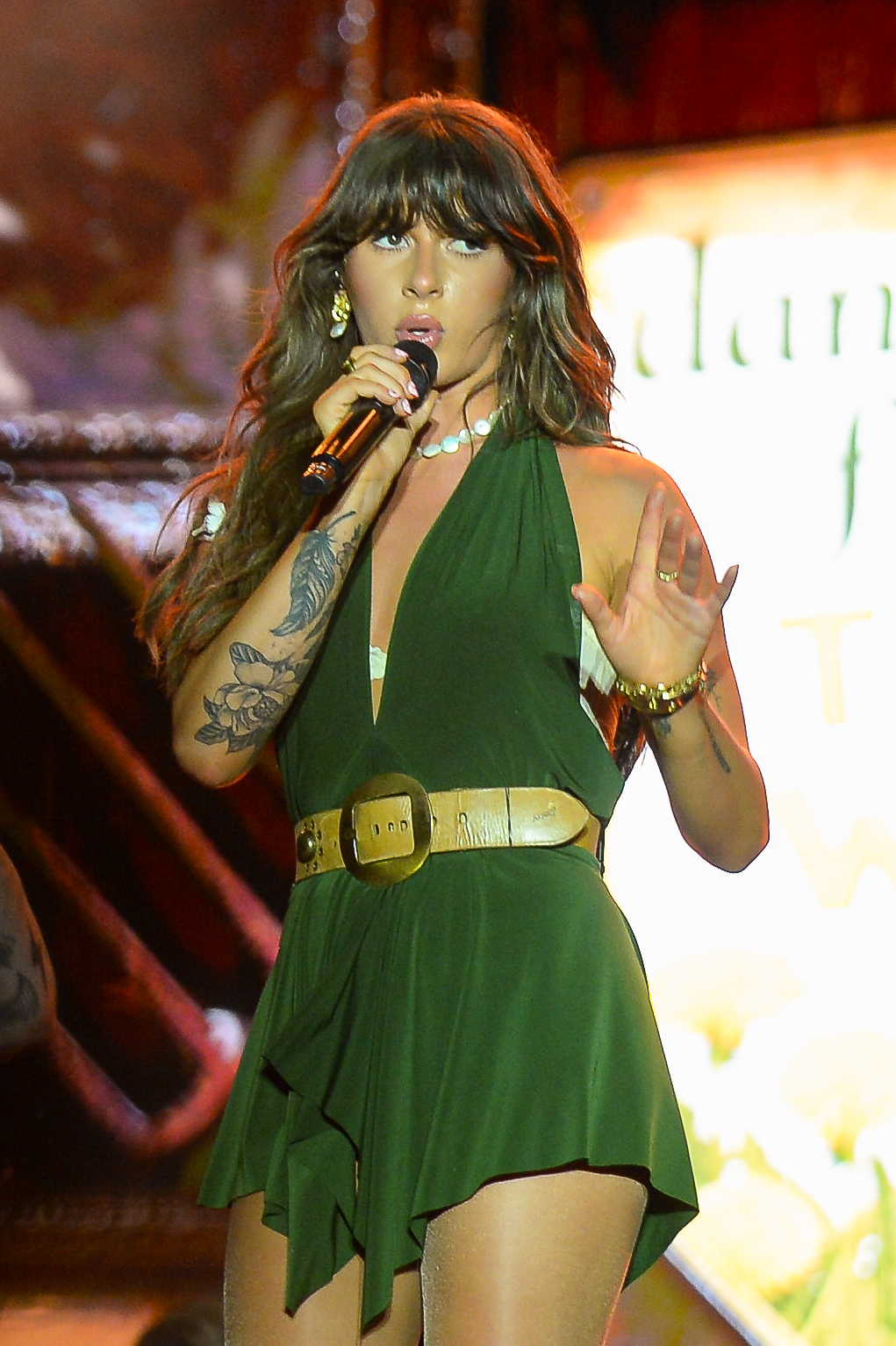
"Choosin' Texas" by Ella Langley broke the record for longest-running number-one song in Billboard history, topping the chart for 28 weeks.

The Billboard Hot 100 is a chart that ranks the best-performing songs in the United States. Its data is compiled by Luminate Data and is published by the American music magazine Billboard. The chart is based on each song's weekly physical and digital sales collectively, the amount of airplay impressions it receives on American radio stations, and its audio and video streams on online digital music platforms.

With 28 non-consecutive weeks atop the Hot 100, "Choosin' Texas" (2025) by Ella Langley became the longest-reigning chart-topper in Hot 100 history, surpassing "All I Want for Christmas Is You" by Mariah Carey. Taylor Swift became the artist with the third-most number ones on the Hot 100, following her 15th chart-topper, "I Knew It, I Knew You" (2026) from the soundtrack of the 2026 film Toy Story 5. It also marked the third number-one song from an animated Disney film, after "A Whole New World" from Aladdin (1992) and "We Don't Talk About Bruno" from Encanto (2021), and the first for Pixar.

As of the chart dated November 21, ten artists have reached the number one spot in 2026, with one―Langley―reaching the top spot for the first time. Swift is the only artist to chart more than one number-one song during the year, with four.

== Chart history ==
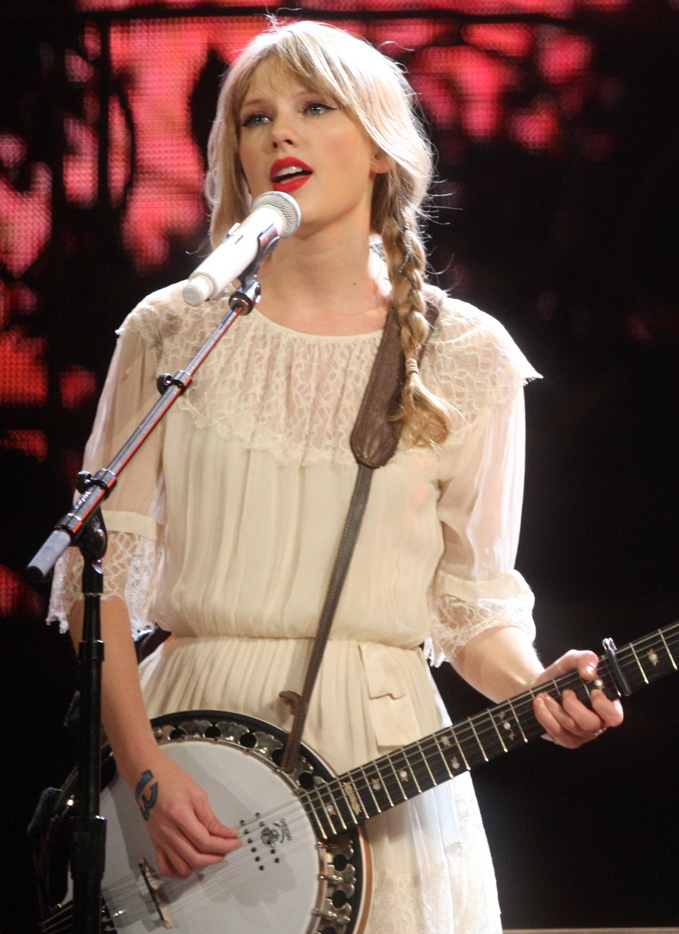
Taylor Swift charted the most number-one songs of 2026 (four), with "The Fate of Ophelia", "Opalite", "I Knew It, I Knew You", and "Patient Zero".

| No. | Issue date | Song | Artist(s) | Ref. |
|---|---|---|---|---|
| re | January 3 | "All I Want for Christmas Is You" | Mariah Carey | |
| re | January 10 | "The Fate of Ophelia" | Taylor Swift | |
| re | January 17 | "The Fate of Ophelia" | Taylor Swift | |
| 1185 | January 24 | "I Just Might" | Bruno Mars | |
| 1185 | January 31 | "I Just Might" | Bruno Mars | |
| 1186 | February 7 | "Aperture" | Harry Styles | |
| 1187 | February 14 | "Choosin' Texas" | Ella Langley | |
| 1188 | February 21 | "DTMF" | Bad Bunny | |
| 1189 | February 28 | "Opalite" | Taylor Swift | |
| re | March 7 | "Choosin' Texas" | Ella Langley | |
| re | March 14 | "I Just Might" | Bruno Mars | |
| re | March 21 | "Choosin' Texas" | Ella Langley | |
| re | March 28 | "Choosin' Texas" | Ella Langley | |
| 1190 | April 4 | "Swim" | BTS | |
| re | April 11 | "Choosin' Texas" | Ella Langley | |
| re | April 18 | "Choosin' Texas" | Ella Langley | |
| re | April 25 | "Choosin' Texas" | Ella Langley | |
| 1191 | May 2 | "Drop Dead" | Olivia Rodrigo | |
| re | May 9 | "Choosin' Texas" | Ella Langley | |
| re | May 16 | "Choosin' Texas" | Ella Langley | |
| re | May 23 | "Choosin' Texas" | Ella Langley | |
| 1192 | May 30 | "Janice STFU" | Drake | |
| 1192 | June 6 | "Janice STFU" | Drake | |
| 1193 | June 13 | "Hate That I Made You Love Me" | Ariana Grande | |
| 1194 | June 20 | "I Knew It, I Knew You" | Taylor Swift | |
| 1194 | June 27 | "I Knew It, I Knew You" | Taylor Swift | |
| re | July 4 | "Choosin' Texas" | Ella Langley | |
| re | July 11 | "Choosin' Texas" | Ella Langley | |
| re | July 18 | "Choosin' Texas" | Ella Langley | |
| re | July 25 | "Choosin' Texas" | Ella Langley | |
| re | August 1 | "Choosin' Texas" | Ella Langley | |
| re | August 8 | "Choosin' Texas" | Ella Langley | |
| re | August 15 | "Choosin' Texas" | Ella Langley | |
| re | August 22 | "Choosin' Texas" | Ella Langley | |
| re | August 29 | "Choosin' Texas" | Ella Langley | |
| re | September 5 | "Choosin' Texas" | Ella Langley | |
| re | September 12 | "Choosin' Texas" | Ella Langley | |
| re | September 19 | "Choosin' Texas" | Ella Langley | |
| re | September 26 | "Choosin' Texas" | Ella Langley | |
| re | October 3 | "Choosin' Texas" | Ella Langley | |
| 1195 | October 10 | "Patient Zero" | Taylor Swift | |
| 1195 | October 17 | "Patient Zero" | Taylor Swift | |
| 1195 | October 24 | "Patient Zero" | Taylor Swift | |
| re | October 31 | "Choosin' Texas" | Ella Langley | |
| re | November 7 | "Choosin' Texas" | Ella Langley | |
| re | November 14 | "Choosin' Texas" | Ella Langley | |
| re | November 21 | "Choosin' Texas" | Ella Langley | |

== Number-one artists ==
List of number-one artists by total weeks at number one
| Artist | Weeks at No. 1 |
|---|---|
| Ella Langley | 28 |
| Taylor Swift | 8 |
| Bruno Mars | 3 |
| Drake | 2 |
| Mariah Carey | 1 |
| Harry Styles | 1 |
| Bad Bunny | 1 |
| BTS | 1 |
| Olivia Rodrigo | 1 |
| Ariana Grande | 1 |

== See also ==
- List of Billboard 200 number-one albums of 2026
- List of Billboard Global 200 number-ones of 2026
- List of Billboard Hot 100 top-ten singles in 2026
- List of Billboard Hot 100 number-one singles of the 2020s
- 2026 in American music
