= List of number-one albums of 2026 (Canada) =

These are the Canadian number-one albums of 2026. The chart is compiled by Luminate and published in Billboard magazine as Billboard Canadian Albums.

== Number-one albums ==
List of number-one albums
Issue date	Album	Artist(s)	Ref.
January 3	Christmas	Michael Bublé	
January 10	The Life of a Showgirl	Taylor Swift	
January 17	The Life of a Showgirl	Taylor Swift	
January 24	With Heaven on Top	Zach Bryan	
January 31	With Heaven on Top	Zach Bryan	
February 7	With Heaven on Top	Zach Bryan	
February 14	Octane	Don Toliver	
February 21	Debí Tirar Más Fotos	Bad Bunny	
February 28	Debí Tirar Más Fotos	Bad Bunny	
March 7	Luck... or Something	Hilary Duff	
March 14	The Romantic	Bruno Mars	
March 21	Kiss All the Time. Disco, Occasionally	Harry Styles	
March 28	Kiss All the Time. Disco, Occasionally	Harry Styles	
April 4	Arirang	BTS	
April 11	Arirang	BTS	
April 18	Arirang	BTS	
April 25	Dandelion	Ella Langley	
May 2	Dandelion	Ella Langley	
May 9	The Great Divide	Noah Kahan	
May 16	The Great Divide	Noah Kahan	
May 23	The Great Divide	Noah Kahan	
May 30	Iceman	Drake	
June 6	Iceman	Drake	
June 13	Iceman	Drake	
June 20	Iceman	Drake	
June 27	You Seem Pretty Sad for a Girl So in Love	Olivia Rodrigo	
July 4	You Seem Pretty Sad for a Girl So in Love	Olivia Rodrigo	
July 11	You Seem Pretty Sad for a Girl So in Love	Olivia Rodrigo	
July 18	Confessions II	Madonna	
July 25	Iceman	Drake	
August 1	Daughter from Hell	Gracie Abrams	
August 8	Dandelion	Ella Langley	
August 15	Petal	Ariana Grande	
August 22	Petal	Ariana Grande	
August 29	Dandelion	Ella Langley	
September 5	The Great Divide	Noah Kahan	
September 12	The Great Divide	Noah Kahan	
September 19	The Great Divide	Noah Kahan	
September 26	The Great Divide	Noah Kahan	
October 3	The Great Divide	Noah Kahan	
October 10	The Life of a Showgirl	Taylor Swift	
October 17	Habibti	Drake	
October 24	The Great Divide	Noah Kahan	
October 31	Young Manhood and Other Donatable Organs	Zach Bryan	
November 7	You Seem Pretty Sad for a Girl So in Love	Olivia Rodrigo	
November 14	You Seem Pretty Sad for a Girl So in Love	Olivia Rodrigo	
November 21	You Seem Pretty Sad for a Girl So in Love	Olivia Rodrigo	

== See also ==
- List of Canadian Hot 100 number-one singles of 2026
