= List of number-one singles of 2025 (Spain) =

This lists the singles that reached number one on the Spanish PROMUSICAE sales and airplay charts in 2025. Total sales correspond to the data sent by regular contributors to sales volumes and by digital distributors.

== Chart history ==
Week	Issue date	Top Streaming, Downloads & Physical Sales			Most Airplay		
Week	Issue date	Artist(s)	Song	Ref.	Artist(s)	Song	Ref.
1	December 27	Yorghaki and Alleh	"Capaz (Merengueton)"		Dani Fernández	"Me Has Invitado a Bailar"	
2	January 3	Yorghaki and Alleh	"Capaz (Merengueton)"		Dani Fernández	"Me Has Invitado a Bailar"	
3	January 10	Bad Bunny	"DTMF"		Mark Ambor	"Belong Together"	
4	January 17	Bad Bunny	"DTMF"		Lady Gaga and Bruno Mars	"Die with a Smile"	
5	January 24	Bad Bunny	"Nuevayol"		Dani Fernández	"Me Has Invitado a Bailar"	
6	January 31	Bad Bunny	"Nuevayol"		Mark Ambor	"Belong Together"	
7	February 7	Yorghaki and Alleh	"Capaz (Merengueton)"		Mark Ambor	"Belong Together"	
8	February 14	Yorghaki and Alleh	"Capaz (Merengueton)"		Dani Fernández	"Me Has Invitado a Bailar"	
9	February 21	Yorghaki and Alleh	"Capaz (Merengueton)"		Dani Fernández	"Me Has Invitado a Bailar"	
10	February 28	Yorghaki and Alleh	"Capaz (Merengueton)"		Dani Fernández	"Me Has Invitado a Bailar"	
11	March 7	W Sound, Beéle and Ovy on the Drums	"La Plena (W Sound 05)"		Dani Fernández	"Me Has Invitado a Bailar"	
12	March 14	W Sound, Beéle and Ovy on the Drums	"La Plena (W Sound 05)"		Dani Fernández	"Me Has Invitado a Bailar"	
13	March 21	Delaossa, Quevedo and Bigla the Kid	"Still Luvin'"		Dani Fernández	"Me Has Invitado a Bailar"	
14	March 28	W Sound, Beéle and Ovy on the Drums	"La Plena (W Sound 05)"		Lady Gaga and Bruno Mars	"Die with a Smile"	
15	April 4	W Sound, Beéle and Ovy on the Drums	"La Plena (W Sound 05)"		Dani Fernández	"Me Has Invitado a Bailar"	
16	April 11	W Sound, Beéle and Ovy on the Drums	"La Plena (W Sound 05)"		Lady Gaga and Bruno Mars	"Die With a Smile"	
17	April 18	W Sound, Beéle and Ovy on the Drums	"La Plena (W Sound 05)"		Dani Fernández	"Me Has Invitado a Bailar"	
18	April 25	W Sound, Beéle and Ovy on the Drums	"La Plena (W Sound 05)"		Dani Fernández	"Me Has Invitado a Bailar"	
19	May 2	W Sound, Beéle and Ovy on the Drums	"La Plena (W Sound 05)"		Rosé and Bruno Mars	"Apt."	
20	May 9	W Sound, Beéle and Ovy on the Drums	"La Plena (W Sound 05)"		Dani Fernández	"Me Has Invitado a Bailar"	
21	May 16	W Sound, Beéle and Ovy on the Drums	"La Plena (W Sound 05)"		Dani Fernández	"Me Has Invitado a Bailar"	
22	May 23	Mora and C. Tangana	"Droga"		Rosé and Bruno Mars	"Apt."	
23	May 30	Beéle	"No Tiene Sentido"		Dani Fernández	"Me Has Invitado a Bailar"	
24	June 6	Beéle	"No Tiene Sentido"		Alex Warren	"Ordinary"	
25	June 13	Beéle	"No Tiene Sentido"		Dani Fernández	"Me Has Invitado a Bailar"	
26	June 20	Beéle	"No Tiene Sentido"		Alex Warren	"Ordinary"	
27	June 27	W Sound, Beéle and Ovy on the Drums	"La Plena (W Sound 05)"		Alex Warren	"Ordinary"	
28	July 4	W Sound, Beéle and Ovy on the Drums	"La Plena (W Sound 05)"		Dani Fernández	"Me Has Invitado a Bailar"	
29	July 11	Quevedo	"Tuchat"		Alex Warren	"Ordinary"	
30	July 18	W Sound, Beéle and Ovy on the Drums	"La Plena (W Sound 05)"		Alex Warren	"Ordinary"	
31	July 25	W Sound, Beéle and Ovy on the Drums	"La Plena (W Sound 05)"		Alex Warren	"Ordinary"	
32	August 1	Rels B	"Tu Vas Sin (Fav)"		Alex Warren	"Ordinary"	
33	August 8	Rels B	"Tu Vas Sin (Fav)"		Doechii	"Anxiety"	
34	August 15	Rels B	"Tu Vas Sin (Fav)"		Alex Warren	"Ordinary"	
35	August 22	Rels B	"Tu Vas Sin (Fav)"		Alex Warren	"Ordinary"	
36	August 29	Kidd Voodoo and JC Reyes	"Me Mareo"		Aitana	"6 de Febrero"	
37	September 5	Rels B	"Tu Vas Sin (Fav)"		Alex Warren	"Ordinary"	
38	September 12	Kidd Voodoo and JC Reyes	"Me Mareo"		Doechii	"Anxiety"	
39	September 19	Kidd Voodoo and JC Reyes	"Me Mareo"		Lola Young	"Messy"	
40	September 26	Kidd Voodoo and JC Reyes	"Me Mareo"		Alex Warren	"Ordinary"	
41	October 3	Taylor Swift	"The Fate of Ophelia"		Alex Warren	"Ordinary"	
42	October 10	Huntrix	"Golden"		Alex Warren	"Ordinary"	
43	October 17	Huntrix	"Golden"		Huntrix	"Golden"	
44	October 24	Rosalía, Björk and Yves Tumor	"Berghain"		Huntrix	"Golden"	
45	October 31	Rosalía, Björk and Yves Tumor	"Berghain"		Nil Moliner	"Nexo 04:Tu Cuerpo en Braille"	
46	November 7	Rosalía and Yahritza y su Esencia	"La Perla"		Huntrix	"Golden"	
47	November 14	Rosalía and Yahritza y su Esencia	"La Perla"		Huntrix	"Golden"	
48	November 21	Rosalía and Yahritza y su Esencia	"La Perla"		Alex Warren	"Ordinary"	
49	November 28	Rosalía and Yahritza y su Esencia	"La Perla"		Huntrix	"Golden"	
50	December 5	Rosalía and Yahritza y su Esencia	"La Perla"		Nil Moliner	"Nexo 04:Tu Cuerpo en Braille"	
51	December 12	Rosalía and Yahritza y su Esencia	"La Perla"		Nil Moliner	"Nexo 04:Tu Cuerpo en Braille"	
52	December 19	Rosalía and Yahritza y su Esencia	"La Perla"		Huntrix	"Golden"	
1	December 26	Romeo Santos and Prince Royce	"Dardos"		Huntrix	"Golden"	
