= List of Billboard Hot 100 number ones of 2025 =

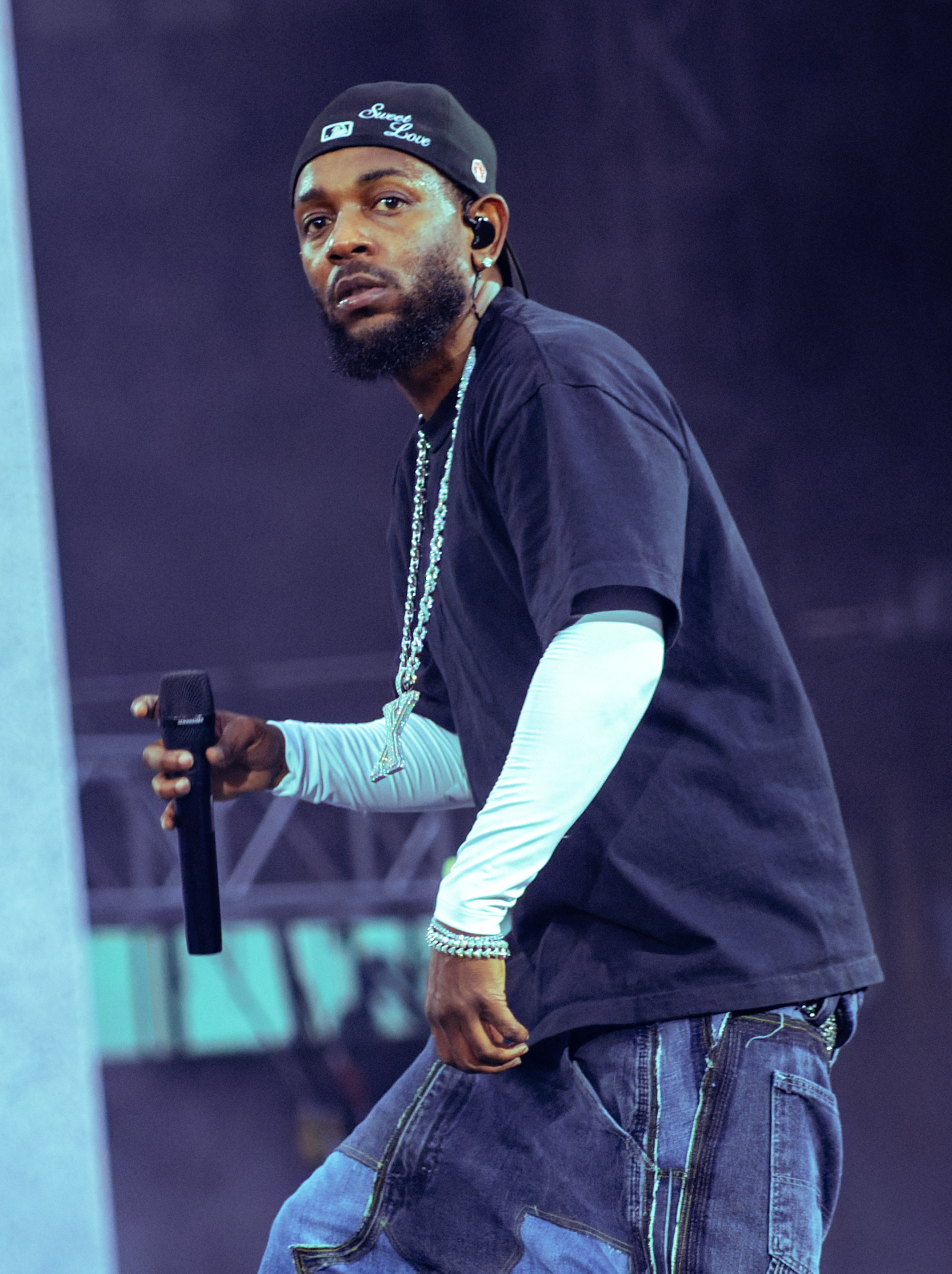
Kendrick Lamar topped the Hot 100 for fourteen weeks with "Not Like Us" and the SZA collaboration "Luther", to become the artist with the most time atop the chart in 2025.

The Billboard Hot 100 is a chart that ranks the best performing songs in the United States. Its data is compiled by Luminate Data and is published by the American music magazine Billboard. The chart is based on each song's weekly physical and digital sales collectively, the amount of airplay impressions it receives on American radio stations, and its audio and video streams on online digital music platforms.

"Die with a Smile" (2024) by Lady Gaga and Bruno Mars topped the Billboard Hot 100 Year-End Chart of 2025 as the best-performing single of the year. "Not Like Us" (2024) by Kendrick Lamar returned to the top spot for a third week in 2025, following his Super Bowl LIX halftime show on February 9, becoming the first non-holiday song (second after Mariah Carey's 1994 "All I Want for Christmas Is You") to top the chart three separate times with breaks of two or more months in between each of its runs at the number one position. The following week, Lamar became the 15th act to replace themself at number one, with the SZA duet "Luther" (2024). With thirteen weeks atop the chart, it became the longest-running number-one single of the year, the 46th song to rank at number one for at least ten weeks, and the longest-running number one for both Lamar and SZA. Huntrix, a virtual band from the 2025 film KPop Demon Hunters, became the first girl group since Destiny's Child in 2001 and the first South Korean female act (Note: The other South Korean acts to top the chart were BTS, Jimin and Jung Kook, thus making "Golden" the first number-one song not performed by BTS or the band's solo member.) to top the chart, aided by "Golden" (2025). Furthermore, the song became the fifth number-one in history credited to a fictional band. In December, Carey's "All I Want for Christmas Is You" returned to number one for the seventh consecutive year, spending its twentieth week atop the chart and breaking the record for the longest-running number-one song since the chart's inception in 1958. (Note: Carey previously held the record for 25 years, with her 1995 Boyz II Men duet "One Sweet Day", before being surpassed by Lil Nas X's "Old Town Road" in 2019 – the same year "All I Want for Christmas Is You" reached number one for the first time.)

Fifteen artists managed to reach the number one spot on the chart in 2025, with six―Tate McRae, Alex Warren, Huntrix, Ejae, Audrey Nuna and Rei Ami―reaching the top spot for the first time. Lamar is the only artist to chart two number one songs during the year.

The year was marked by little to no movement on the charts, with a huge number of songs lingering around or having been released the previous year, making 2025 one of the most stagnant years for popular music in Billboard chart history. This resulted in Billboard enacting a new recurrent rule effective with the chart dated October 25, making songs that fall below the top 50 with at least 20 weeks; below the top 25 with at least 26 weeks; below the top 10 with at least 52 weeks; or below the top five after at least 78 weeks, go recurrent.

== Chart history ==
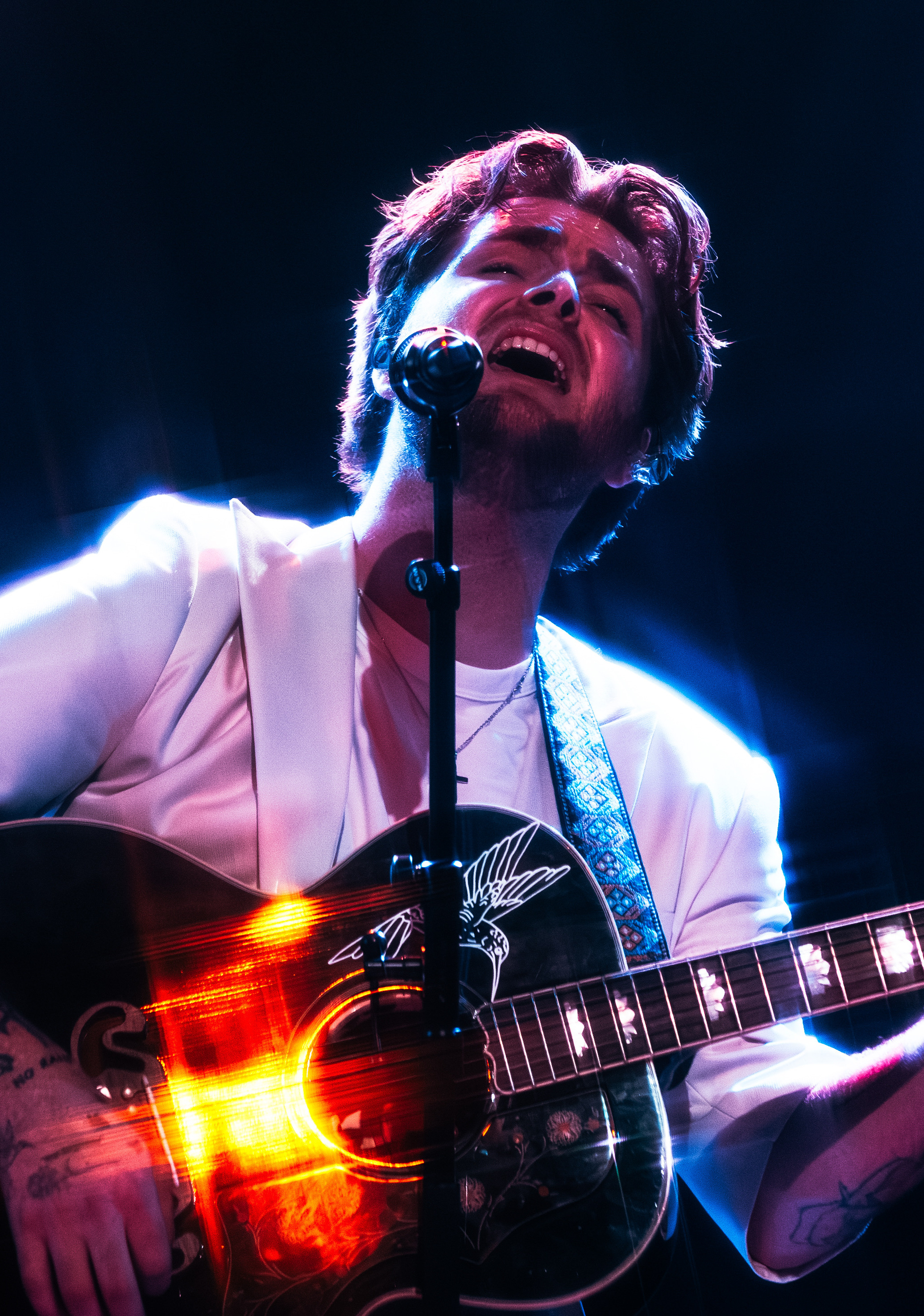
"Ordinary" by Alex Warren topped the Hot 100 for ten weeks, to become the longest-running number-one song by a solo artist in 2025.

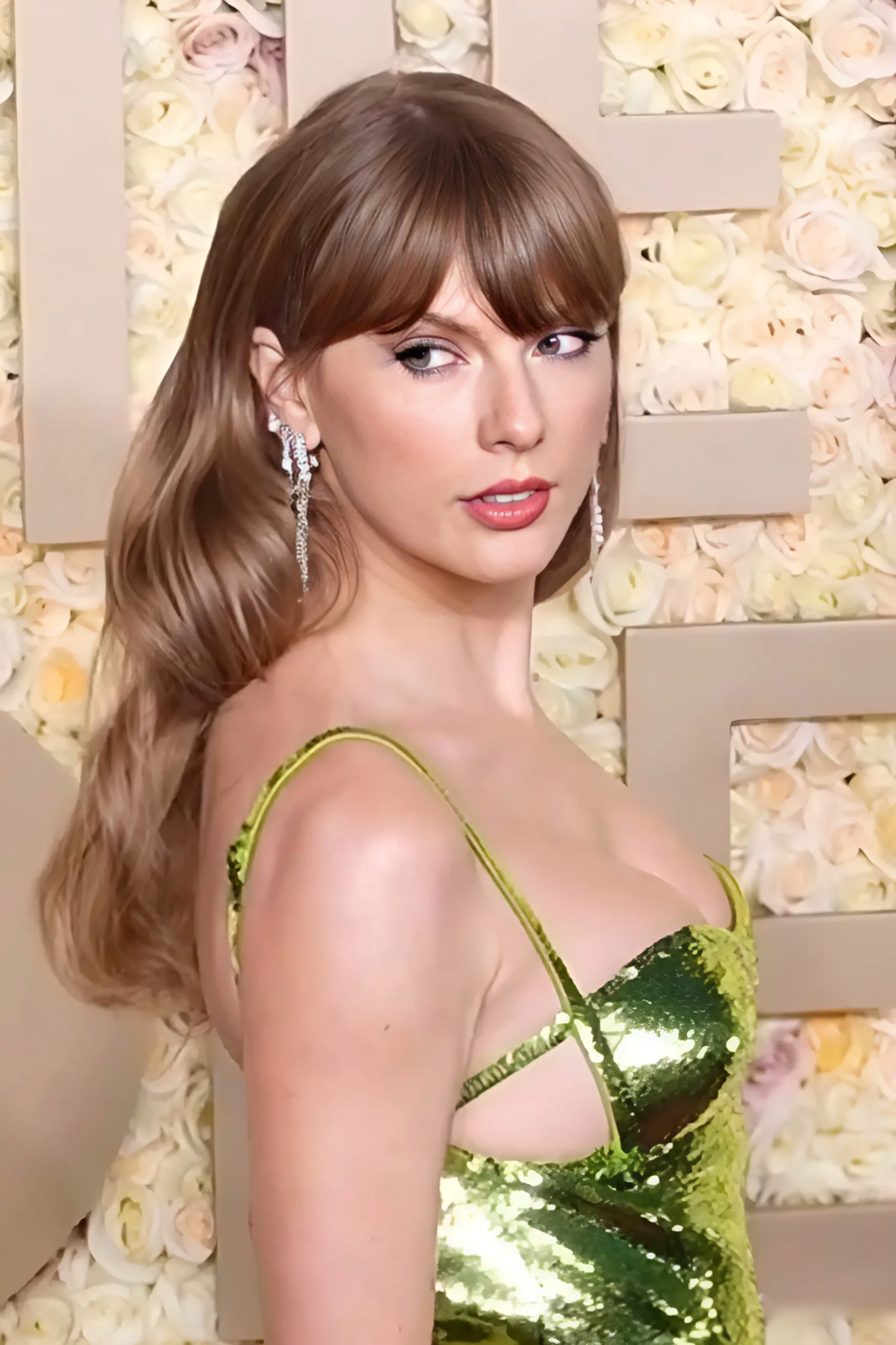
Taylor Swift's thirteenth number-one single, "The Fate of Ophelia", was the longest running chart-topper of the year by a female artist, with eight weeks at number one in 2025, in addition to two more weeks in 2026.

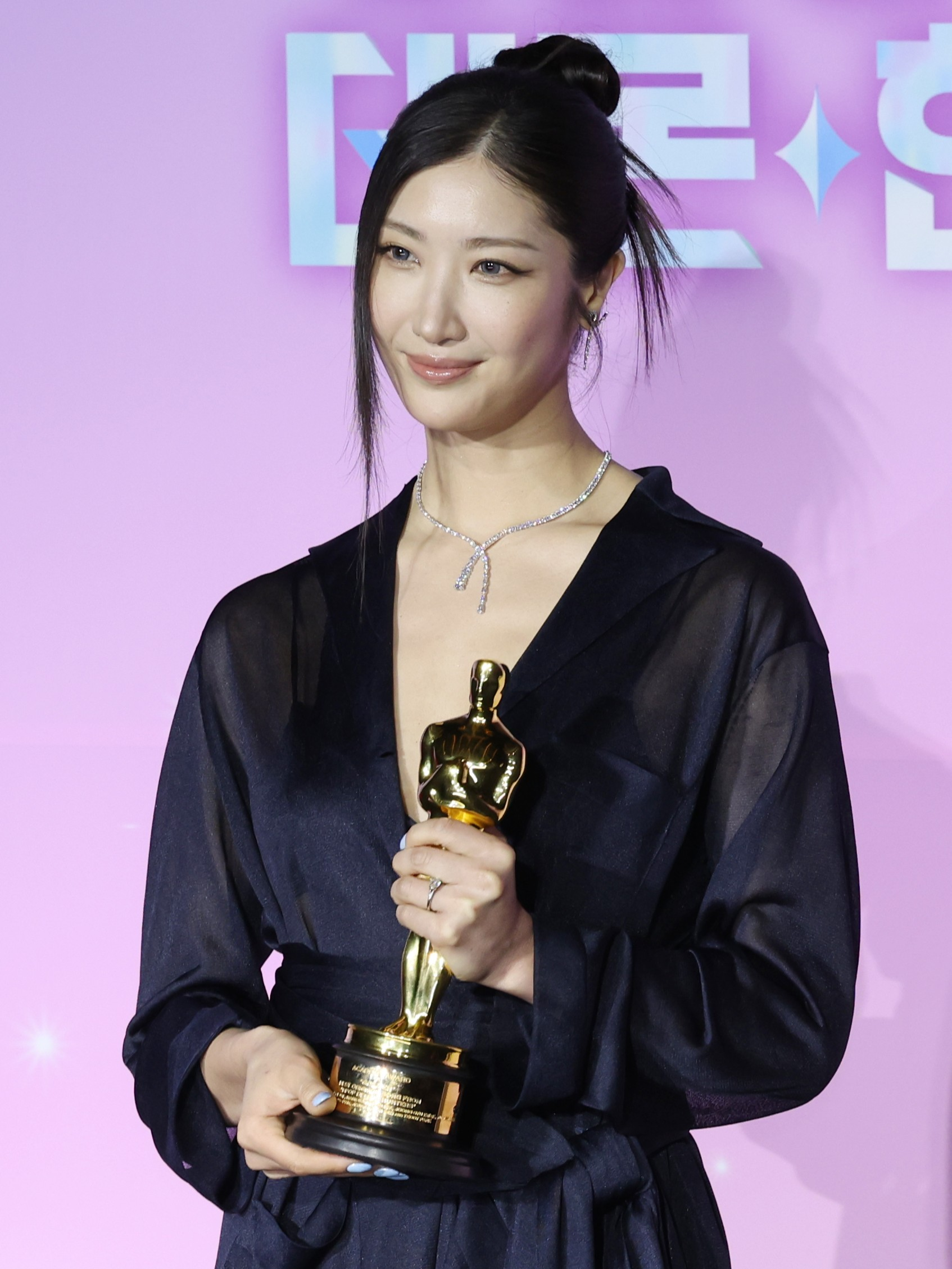
Ejae (pictured), Audrey Nuna and Rei Ami—the singing voices for Huntrix—are all credited on "Golden", which topped the chart for eight weeks.

Key
†	Indicates best-performing song of 2025

No.	Issue date	Song	Artist(s)	Ref.
re	January 4	"All I Want for Christmas Is You"	Mariah Carey	
1177	January 11	"Die with a Smile" †	Lady Gaga and Bruno Mars	
1177	January 18	"Die with a Smile" †	Lady Gaga and Bruno Mars	
1177	January 25	"Die with a Smile" †	Lady Gaga and Bruno Mars	
1177	February 1	"Die with a Smile" †	Lady Gaga and Bruno Mars	
1178	February 8	"4x4"	Travis Scott	
re	February 15	"Die with a Smile" †	Lady Gaga and Bruno Mars	
re	February 22	"Not Like Us"	Kendrick Lamar	
1179	March 1	"Luther"	Kendrick Lamar and SZA	
1179	March 8	"Luther"	Kendrick Lamar and SZA	
1179	March 15	"Luther"	Kendrick Lamar and SZA	
1179	March 22	"Luther"	Kendrick Lamar and SZA	
1179	March 29	"Luther"	Kendrick Lamar and SZA	
1179	April 5	"Luther"	Kendrick Lamar and SZA	
1179	April 12	"Luther"	Kendrick Lamar and SZA	
1179	April 19	"Luther"	Kendrick Lamar and SZA	
1179	April 26	"Luther"	Kendrick Lamar and SZA	
1179	May 3	"Luther"	Kendrick Lamar and SZA	
1179	May 10	"Luther"	Kendrick Lamar and SZA	
1179	May 17	"Luther"	Kendrick Lamar and SZA	
1179	May 24	"Luther"	Kendrick Lamar and SZA	
1180	May 31	"What I Want"	Morgan Wallen featuring Tate McRae	
1181	June 7	"Ordinary"	Alex Warren	
1181	June 14	"Ordinary"	Alex Warren	
1182	June 21	"Manchild"	Sabrina Carpenter	
re	June 28	"Ordinary"	Alex Warren	
re	July 5	"Ordinary"	Alex Warren	
re	July 12	"Ordinary"	Alex Warren	
re	July 19	"Ordinary"	Alex Warren	
re	July 26	"Ordinary"	Alex Warren	
re	August 2	"Ordinary"	Alex Warren	
re	August 9	"Ordinary"	Alex Warren	
1183	August 16	"Golden"	Huntrix: Ejae, Audrey Nuna and Rei Ami	
re	August 23	"Ordinary"	Alex Warren	
re	August 30	"Golden"	Huntrix: Ejae, Audrey Nuna and Rei Ami	
re	September 6	"Golden"	Huntrix: Ejae, Audrey Nuna and Rei Ami	
re	September 13	"Golden"	Huntrix: Ejae, Audrey Nuna and Rei Ami	
re	September 20	"Golden"	Huntrix: Ejae, Audrey Nuna and Rei Ami	
re	September 27	"Golden"	Huntrix: Ejae, Audrey Nuna and Rei Ami	
re	October 4	"Golden"	Huntrix: Ejae, Audrey Nuna and Rei Ami	
re	October 11	"Golden"	Huntrix: Ejae, Audrey Nuna and Rei Ami	
1184	October 18	"The Fate of Ophelia"	Taylor Swift	
1184	October 25	"The Fate of Ophelia"	Taylor Swift	
1184	November 1	"The Fate of Ophelia"	Taylor Swift	
1184	November 8	"The Fate of Ophelia"	Taylor Swift	
1184	November 15	"The Fate of Ophelia"	Taylor Swift	
1184	November 22	"The Fate of Ophelia"	Taylor Swift	
1184	November 29	"The Fate of Ophelia"	Taylor Swift	
1184	December 6	"The Fate of Ophelia"	Taylor Swift	
re	December 13	"All I Want for Christmas Is You"	Mariah Carey	
re	December 20	"All I Want for Christmas Is You"	Mariah Carey	
re	December 27	"All I Want for Christmas Is You"	Mariah Carey	

== Number-one artists ==
List of number-one artists by total weeks at number one
Artist	Weeks at No. 1
Kendrick Lamar	14
SZA	13
Alex Warren	10
Huntrix: Ejae, Audrey Nuna and Rei Ami	8
Taylor Swift	8
Lady Gaga	5
Bruno Mars	5
Mariah Carey	4
Travis Scott	1
Morgan Wallen	1
Tate McRae	1
Sabrina Carpenter	1

== See also ==
- List of Billboard 200 number-one albums of 2025
- List of Billboard Global 200 number ones of 2025
- List of Billboard Hot 100 top-ten singles in 2025
- List of Billboard Hot 100 number-one singles of the 2020s
- Billboard Year-End Hot 100 singles of 2025
- 2025 in American music
