= Spotify Billions Club =

- Awarded for: Songs surpassing 1 billion streams on Spotify
- Presented by: Spotify
- Status: Active
- Established: 2020

The Spotify Billions Club is an editorial playlist and industry accolade established by the music streaming service Spotify to recognize songs that have surpassed one billion streams on the platform. First launched in 2020, the playlist serves as a hallmark of elite commercial success in the streaming era.

Artists whose tracks achieve this milestone are awarded a customized silver "Billions Club" plaque, which has become a notable cultural symbol within the music industry.

== History ==
In October 2016, "One Dance" by Drake featuring Wizkid and Kyla became the first song in Spotify history to surpass one billion streams. Over the following years, as the global streaming market expanded, the number of tracks reaching this milestone grew exponentially.

To formalize this achievement, Spotify officially launched the "Billions Club" editorial playlist in 2020. At its inception, the playlist featured approximately 150 songs. By 2025, the list had grown to include over 850 songs, reflecting the rapid expansion of Spotify's user base and the viral "snowball effect" driven by social media platforms like TikTok.

== Accolades and media ==
=== The Plaque ===
Artists who join the Billions Club receive a physical commemorative plaque from Spotify. The plaque features a large silver dish or bowl emblazoned with the Spotify logo and text celebrating the track's milestone. It has become a tradition for artists to celebrate their induction by eating food out of the plaque—such as cereal, pasta, or snacks—and sharing the videos on social media.

=== Billions Club: The Series ===
In July 2023, Spotify announced Billions Club: The Series, a digital franchise produced in collaboration with OBB Pictures. Directed by Michael D. Ratner, the short-form series features popular artists—such as Billie Eilish, Post Malone, and Bad Bunny—unboxing their plaques and celebrating the achievement in creative ways.

=== Billions Club Live ===
In December 2024, Spotify expanded the brand into live events by launching Billions Club Live, a concert series allowing artists to celebrate their milestone directly with fans. The inaugural event featured The Weeknd performing in Los Angeles, followed by subsequent landmark performances from Ed Sheeran in Dublin, Miley Cyrus in Paris, and Bad Bunny in Tokyo.

== Key milestones ==
- First song to reach 1 billion streams: "One Dance" by Drake featuring Wizkid and Kyla (October 2016).
- Fastest song to reach 1 billion streams: As of November 2024, the fastest song to reach 1 billion streams is "Die With a Smile" by Lady Gaga and Bruno Mars, which achieved the feat in 96 days in late 2024.
- Top-tier clubs: Due to the continuous accumulation of streams, Spotify informally recognizes higher tiers, including the "Two Billions Club" and "Three Billions Club", featuring tracks like "Blinding Lights" by The Weeknd and "Shape of You" by Ed Sheeran.

== See also ==
- List of Spotify streaming records
- List of most-streamed songs on Spotify
