= List of Billboard 200 number-one albums of 2025 =

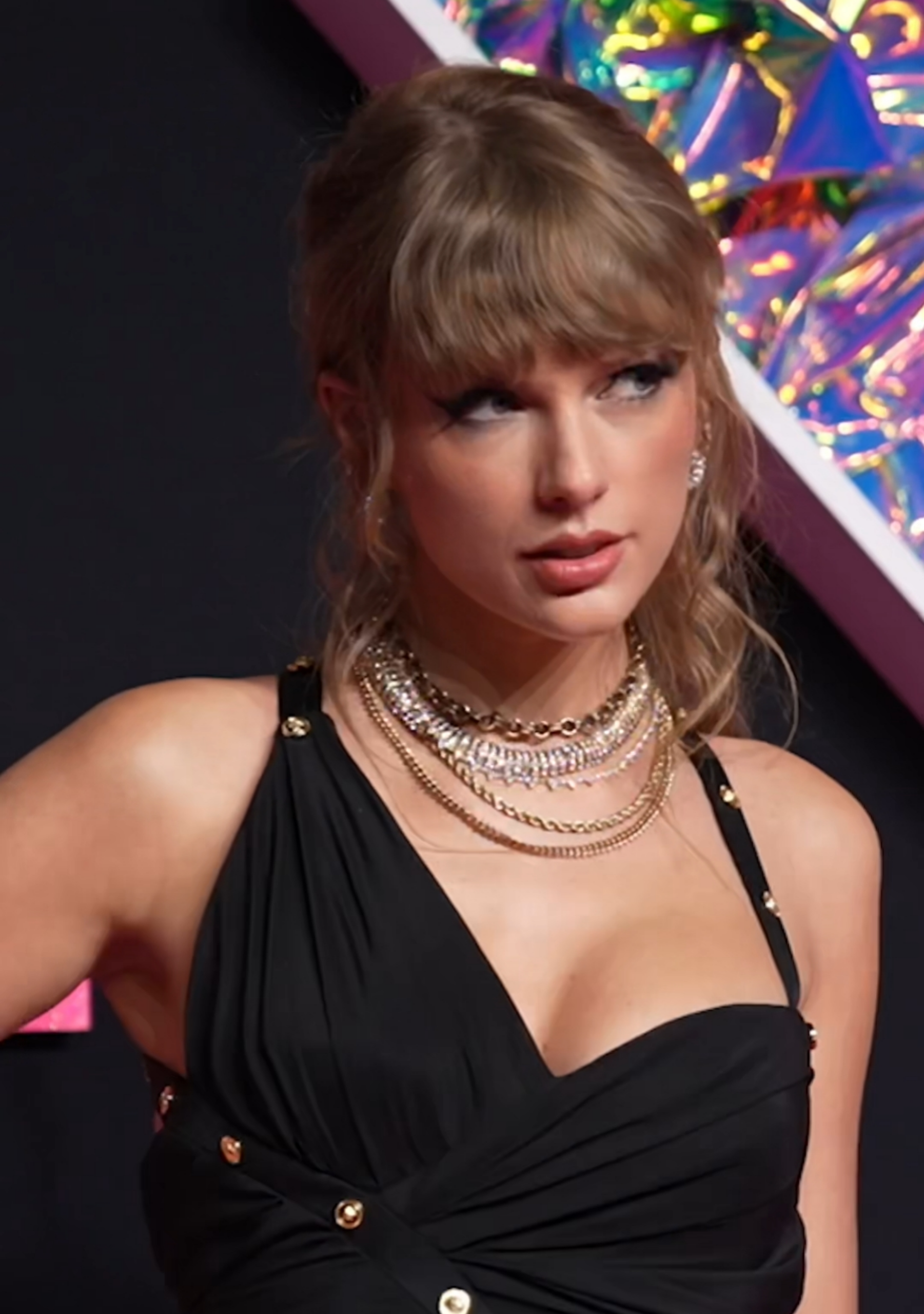
Taylor Swift's The Life of a Showgirl claimed the largest opening week in US history and the best-selling album of 2025.

This is a list of the albums ranked number one in the United States during 2025. The top-performing albums and EPs in the U.S. are ranked on the Billboard 200 chart, which is published by Billboard magazine. The data is compiled by Luminate based on multi-metric consumption as measured in album-equivalent units, which comprise album sales, track sales, and streams on digital music platforms. Each unit equals one album sold, or 10 individual digital tracks sold from an album, or 3,750 ad-supported or 1,250 paid/subscription on-demand official audio and video streams generated by songs from an album.

In an unprecedented feat, The Life of a Showgirl by Taylor Swift became the first album in the Billboard 200 history to earn over 4 million units in its first week, surpassing the previous record set by Adele's 25, which opened with 3.48 million units in 2015.

== Chart history ==
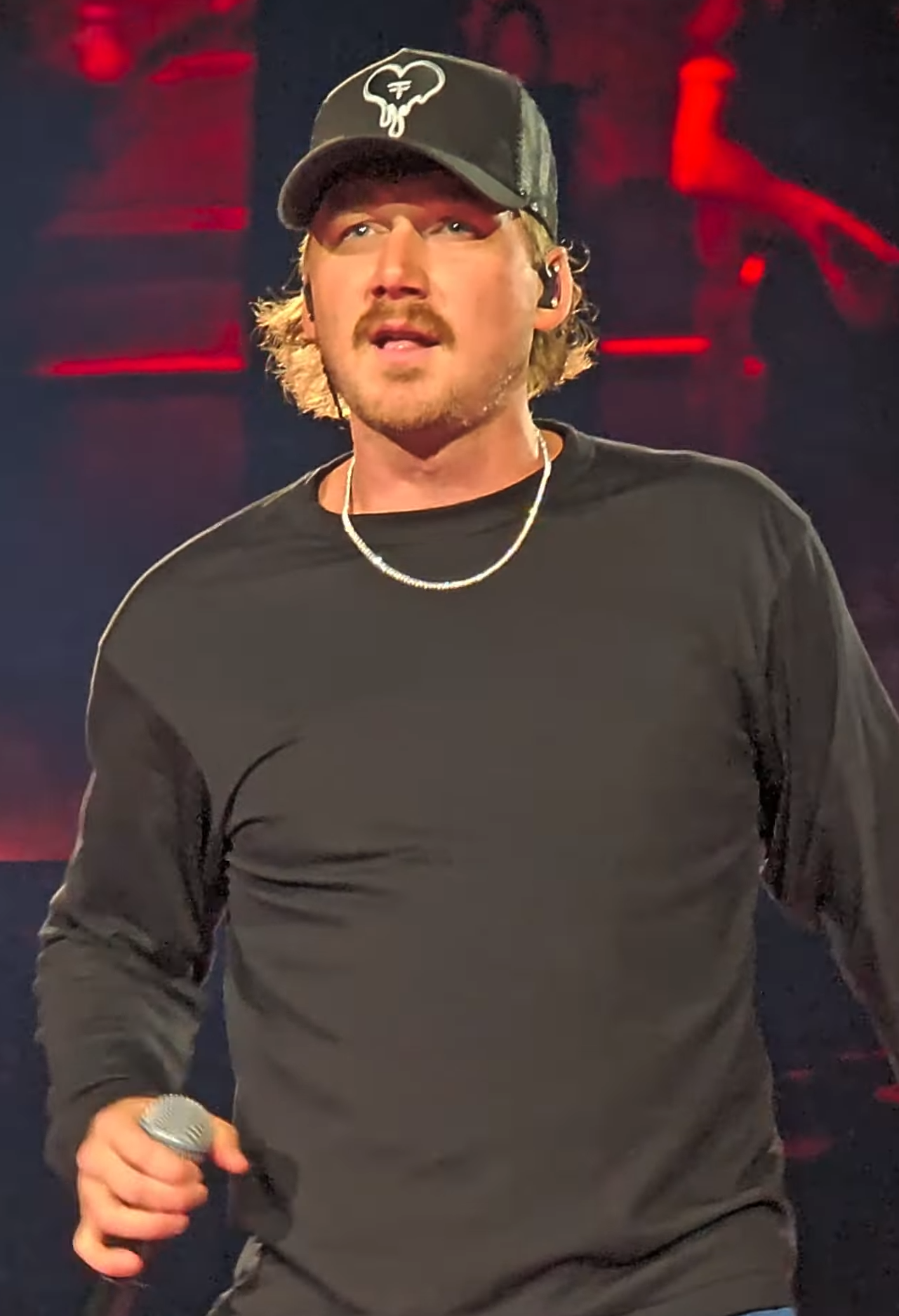
Morgan Wallen's I'm the Problem reigned the Billboard 200 for the longest in 2025 (12 weeks).

Key
†	Indicates the best-performing album of 2025

Issue date	Album	Artist(s)	Units	Ref.
January 4	SOS	SZA	178,000	
January 11	SOS	SZA	130,000	
January 18	WHAM	Lil Baby	140,000	
January 25	Debí Tirar Más Fotos	Bad Bunny	203,500	
February 1	Debí Tirar Más Fotos	Bad Bunny	151,000	
February 8	Debí Tirar Más Fotos	Bad Bunny	117,000	
February 15	Hurry Up Tomorrow	The Weeknd	490,500	
February 22	GNX	Kendrick Lamar	236,000	
March 1	Some Sexy Songs 4 U	PartyNextDoor and Drake	246,000	
March 8	So Close to What	Tate McRae	177,000	
March 15	GNX	Kendrick Lamar	90,500	
March 22	Mayhem	Lady Gaga	219,000	
March 29	Music	Playboi Carti	298,000	
April 5	Music	Playboi Carti	131,000	
April 12	Eternal Sunshine	Ariana Grande	137,000	
April 19	Music	Playboi Carti	64,000	
April 26	More Chaos	Ken Carson	59,500	
May 3	SOS	SZA	52,000	
May 10	Skeletá	Ghost	86,000	
May 17	Debí Tirar Más Fotos	Bad Bunny	84,500	
May 24	Even in Arcadia	Sleep Token	127,000	
May 31	I'm the Problem	Morgan Wallen	493,000	
June 7	I'm the Problem	Morgan Wallen	286,000	
June 14	I'm the Problem	Morgan Wallen	246,000	
June 21	I'm the Problem	Morgan Wallen	209,000	
June 28	I'm the Problem	Morgan Wallen	186,000	
July 5	I'm the Problem	Morgan Wallen	177,000	
July 12	I'm the Problem	Morgan Wallen	173,000	
July 19	I'm the Problem	Morgan Wallen	151,000	
July 26	JackBoys 2	JackBoys and Travis Scott	232,000	
August 2	Don't Tap the Glass	Tyler, the Creator	197,000	
August 9	I'm the Problem	Morgan Wallen	143,000	
August 16	I'm the Problem	Morgan Wallen	136,000	
August 23	I'm the Problem	Morgan Wallen	126,000	
August 30	I'm the Problem	Morgan Wallen	121,000	
September 6	Karma	Stray Kids	313,000	
September 13	Man's Best Friend	Sabrina Carpenter	366,000	
September 20	KPop Demon Hunters	Soundtrack	128,000	
September 27	Breach	Twenty One Pilots	200,000	
October 4	Am I the Drama?	Cardi B	200,000	
October 11	KPop Demon Hunters	Soundtrack	102,000	
October 18	The Life of a Showgirl †	Taylor Swift	4,002,000	
October 25	The Life of a Showgirl †	Taylor Swift	338,000	
November 1	The Life of a Showgirl †	Taylor Swift	194,000	
November 8	The Life of a Showgirl †	Taylor Swift	146,000	
November 15	The Life of a Showgirl †	Taylor Swift	120,000	
November 22	The Life of a Showgirl †	Taylor Swift	110,000	
November 29	The Life of a Showgirl †	Taylor Swift	93,000	
December 6	Do It	Stray Kids	295,000	
December 13	The Life of a Showgirl †	Taylor Swift	99,000	
December 20	The Life of a Showgirl †	Taylor Swift	89,000	
December 27	The Life of a Showgirl †	Taylor Swift	104,000	

== Number-one artists ==
List of number-one artists by total weeks at number one
Rank	Artist	Weeks at No. 1
1	Morgan Wallen	12
2	Taylor Swift	10
3	Bad Bunny	4
4	Playboi Carti	3
4	SZA	3
6	Kendrick Lamar	2
6	Various artists (KPop Demon Hunters)	2
6	Stray Kids	2
9	Lil Baby	1
9	The Weeknd	1
9	PartyNextDoor	1
9	Drake	1
9	Tate McRae	1
9	Lady Gaga	1
9	Ariana Grande	1
9	Ken Carson	1
9	Ghost	1
9	Sleep Token	1
9	JackBoys	1
9	Travis Scott	1
9	Tyler, the Creator	1
9	Sabrina Carpenter	1
9	Twenty One Pilots	1
9	Cardi B	1

== See also ==
- List of Billboard Hot 100 number ones of 2025
- List of Billboard 200 number-one albums of the 2020s
- 2025 in American music
