= List of Billboard 200 number-one albums of 2026 =

This is a list of the albums ranked number one in the United States during 2026. The top-performing albums and EPs in the U.S. are ranked on the Billboard 200 chart, which is published by Billboard magazine. The data is compiled by Luminate based on multi-metric consumption as measured in album-equivalent units, which comprise album sales, track sales, and streams on digital music platforms.

For issues dated January 3 and January 10, each unit equals one album sold, or 10 individual digital tracks sold from an album, or 3,750 ad-supported or 1,250 paid/subscription on-demand official audio and video streams generated by songs from an album. Starting on the issue dated January 17, each unit equals one album sold, or 10 individual digital tracks sold from an album, or 2,500 ad-supported or 1,000 paid/subscription on-demand official audio and video streams generated by songs from an album.

== Chart history ==
| Issue date | Album | Artist(s) | Units | Ref. |
|---|---|---|---|---|
| January 3 | The Life of a Showgirl | Taylor Swift | 141,000 | |
| January 10 | The Life of a Showgirl | Taylor Swift | 81,000 | |
| January 17 | I'm the Problem | Morgan Wallen | 85,000 | |
| January 24 | With Heaven on Top | Zach Bryan | 134,000 | |
| January 31 | Don't Be Dumb | ASAP Rocky | 123,000 | |
| February 7 | Megadeth | Megadeth | 73,000 | |
| February 14 | Octane | Don Toliver | 162,000 | |
| February 21 | The Fall-Off | J. Cole | 280,000 | |
| February 28 | Debí Tirar Más Fotos | Bad Bunny | 135,000 | |
| March 7 | Cloud 9 | Megan Moroney | 147,000 | |
| March 14 | The Romantic | Bruno Mars | 186,000 | |
| March 21 | Kiss All the Time. Disco, Occasionally | Harry Styles | 430,000 | |
| March 28 | Kiss All the Time. Disco, Occasionally | Harry Styles | 99,000 | |
| April 4 | Arirang | BTS | 641,000 | |
| April 11 | Arirang | BTS | 187,000 | |
| April 18 | Arirang | BTS | 124,000 | |
| April 25 | Dandelion | Ella Langley | 169,000 | |
| May 2 | Dandelion | Ella Langley | 106,000 | |
| May 9 | The Great Divide | Noah Kahan | 389,000 | |
| May 16 | The Great Divide | Noah Kahan | 163,000 | |
| May 23 | The Great Divide | Noah Kahan | 132,000 | |
| May 30 | Iceman | Drake | 463,000 | |
| June 6 | Iceman | Drake | 225,000 | |
| June 13 | Iceman | Drake | 171,000 | |
| June 20 | Iceman | Drake | 133,000 | |
| June 27 | You Seem Pretty Sad for a Girl So in Love | Olivia Rodrigo | 485,000 | |
| July 4 | You Seem Pretty Sad for a Girl So in Love | Olivia Rodrigo | 180,000 | |
| July 11 | Golden Hour: Part.5 | Ateez | 228,000 | |
| July 18 | Confessions II | Madonna | 134,000 | |
| July 25 | The Real Me | Future | 131,000 | |
| August 1 | Daughter from Hell | Gracie Abrams | 124,000 | |
| August 8 | I'm the Problem | Morgan Wallen | 80,000 | |
| August 15 | Petal | Ariana Grande | 295,000 | |
| August 22 | This & That | Stray Kids | 369,000 | |
| August 29 | Wild | Katseye | 170,000 | |
| September 5 | The Sin: Bliss | Enhypen | 98,000 | |
| September 12 | Don't Look Down | Rod Wave | 99,000 | |
| September 19 | Dandelion | Ella Langley | 67,000 | |
| September 26 | Westside Whimsy | Jhené Aiko | 74,000 | |
| October 3 | Bass Persuades | Miley Cyrus | 61,000 | |
| October 10 | The Life of a Showgirl | Taylor Swift | 173,000 | |
| October 17 | The Life of a Showgirl | Taylor Swift | 93,000 | |
| October 24 | The Life of a Showgirl | Taylor Swift | 87,000 | |
| October 31 | You Seem Pretty Sad for a Girl So in Love | Olivia Rodrigo | 75,000 | |
| November 7 | The Black Parade | My Chemical Romance | 78,000 | |
| November 14 | You Seem Pretty Sad for a Girl So in Love | Olivia Rodrigo | 57,000 | |
| November 21 | You Seem Pretty Sad for a Girl So in Love | Olivia Rodrigo | 62,000 | |
| November 28 | Golden Hour: Part.6 | Ateez | 195,000 | |

== Number-one artists ==
List of number-one artists by total weeks at number one
| Rank | Artist | Weeks at No. 1 |
|---|---|---|
| 1 | Taylor Swift | 5 |
| 1 | Olivia Rodrigo | 5 |
| 3 | Drake | 4 |
| 4 | BTS | 3 |
| 4 | Noah Kahan | 3 |
| 4 | Ella Langley | 3 |
| 7 | Harry Styles | 2 |
| 7 | Morgan Wallen | 2 |
| 7 | Ateez | 2 |
| 10 | Zach Bryan | 1 |
| 10 | ASAP Rocky | 1 |
| 10 | Megadeth | 1 |
| 10 | Don Toliver | 1 |
| 10 | J. Cole | 1 |
| 10 | Bad Bunny | 1 |
| 10 | Megan Moroney | 1 |
| 10 | Bruno Mars | 1 |
| 10 | Madonna | 1 |
| 10 | Future | 1 |
| 10 | Gracie Abrams | 1 |
| 10 | Ariana Grande | 1 |
| 10 | Stray Kids | 1 |
| 10 | Katseye | 1 |
| 10 | Enhypen | 1 |
| 10 | Rod Wave | 1 |
| 10 | Jhené Aiko | 1 |
| 10 | Miley Cyrus | 1 |
| 10 | My Chemical Romance | 1 |

== See also ==
- List of Billboard Hot 100 number ones of 2026
- List of Billboard 200 number-one albums of the 2020s
- 2026 in American music
