= DTMF (song) =

Single by Bad Bunny

from the album Debí Tirar Más Fotos
- Language: Spanish
- English title: "I Should Have Taken More Photos"
- Released: January 23, 2025
- Genre: Plena; hip-hop; alternative reggaeton
- Length: 3:57
- Label: Rimas
- Songwriters: Benito Martínez; Marco Borrero; Scott Dittrich; Tyler Spry; Benjamin Falik
- Producers: MAG; La Paciencia; Scotty Dittrich; Julia Lewis; Tyler Spry

Bad Bunny singles chronology
"Baile Inolvidable" (2025)	"DTMF" (2025)	"Eoo" (2025)

Visualizer
- "DTMF" on YouTube

"DTMF" (initialism for Debí Tirar Más Fotos, 'I Should Have Taken More Photos', and stylized as "DtMF") is a song by Puerto Rican rapper Bad Bunny. It was released on January 23, 2025, as the fourth single from his sixth solo studio album Debí Tirar Más Fotos (2025). A plena song, with elements of rap and Latin pop or reggaeton, the track sees Bad Bunny singing about how he regrets not having taken more pictures of people he had spent time with.

"DTMF" exploded into popularity almost immediately following its release, and has topped the charts in more than 30 countries, including Argentina, Canada, France, Germany, Italy, Mexico, Spain, and the United States, and reached the top 5 in more than ten others, including Australia, New Zealand, the United Kingdom, Ireland and the Netherlands.

In the United States, it reached number one on the Billboard Hot 100 chart in 2026, becoming the fourth Spanish-language song to do so, after "La Bamba" by Los Lobos in 1987, "Macarena" by Los Del Rio and Bayside Boys in 1996 and "Despacito" by Luis Fonsi, Daddy Yankee and Justin Bieber in 2017. Additionally, it became the first Spanish-language song by a solo artist to top the Billboard Hot 100 chart, and the first Spanish-language song to simultaneously top the Billboard Hot 100, Global 200 and Global 200 Excl. US charts. It also became the longest-running number one song on the Billboard Hot Latin Songs chart in 2026, surpassing the 56 weeks "Despacito" reigned as the longest-running number one song on the chart.

The song received various nominations and awards. It was nominated for Record of the Year and Song of the Year at the 68th Grammy Awards and the 26th Latin Grammy Awards. It also won the awards for Hot Latin Song of the Year, Streaming Song of the Year and Latin Rhythm Song of the Year at the 32nd Billboard Latin Music Awards.

== Background and release ==
On October 13, 2023, Bad Bunny released his fifth solo studio album Nadie Sabe Lo Que Va a Pasar Mañana, which debuted at number one on the US Billboard 200, with the addition of reaching the top 10 in five more countries. It was also supported by his fifth concert tour, the Most Wanted Tour, spanning dates from February to June 2024, all of which sold out and broke multiple records. Between December 2024 and January 2025, he began promoting his sixth solo album, Debí Tirar Más Fotos, releasing supporting singles, an accompanying short film and revealing its tracklist, where "DTMF" was featured as the 16th track and its title track.

"DTMF" was released for digital download and streaming on January 5, 2025, through Rimas Entertainment, as part of Debí Tirar Más Fotos. Only a few days after the release of the track, it went viral on TikTok. Based on its lyrics of looking back on memories, the song was used as a dedication to loved ones with pictures that are special to users of the sound, mainly of those who had passed. Bad Bunny later shared his reaction on the trend on the platform, which sees him in tears.

== Composition ==
"DTMF" is a "nostalgic" track in the key of E major that blends "Nintendo-inspired beats", reminiscent of his 2020 album YHLQMDLG, with "lively Plena", a Puerto Rican "folk call-and-response" genre. On a "mellow beat" with occasional choir chants, Bad Bunny displays his emotions and regrets not having taken more pictures of loved ones or people with whom he had spent periods of time.

== Critical reception ==
In a ranking of all album tracks for Billboard, editors placed it sixth, saying that the song reminds listeners to value "the meaningful aspects of life" over superficiality. They particularly praised the "lively" interplay of reggaeton as a modern element and "a deep sense of nostalgia". Maya Georgi of Rolling Stone thought the song was the album cover come to life, as the chants sound like they were recorded "in the emerald green backyard displayed".

== Commercial performance ==
=== North America ===
Despite having only five days of tracking, "DTMF" debuted at number 38 on the US Billboard Hot 100, on the issue dated January 18, 2025, with 11 million official on-demand streams in the country. The week after, it reached a peak of number two on the chart, earning 34.9 million additional streams within its first full tracking week, and maintained its peak for two consecutive weeks. It became his 15th top-ten song, and his highest-charting solo song on the chart. Following the album's historic wins at the 68th Grammy Awards, the song re-entered the chart at number ten on the week dated February 14, 2026. The following week, after his performance at the Super Bowl LX halftime show, the song surged to number one for the first time, becoming his first solo song to reach number one in the United States.

After its five days of tracking, "DTMF" initially debuted at number five on the US Hot Latin Songs chart. The week after, it rose up four positions to reach a new peak of number one on the chart, additionally reaching this peak on both Latin Streaming Songs and Latin Digital Song Sales charts. It became his 16th number-one song on the former chart. Additionally, it debuted atop the TikTok Billboard Top 50 chart, on the issue dated January 18, 2025, becoming the fifth song to debut atop the chart since it was launched in 2023. The week after, it reached the top of the US Streaming Songs chart, becoming his second number-one song on the chart, after his 2022 single "Me Porto Bonito".

=== South America ===
With limited tracking, "DTMF" debuted at number one in Bolivia and Colombia, staying atop for multiple weeks on both charts. The song instantly swept charts across the continent, reaching number one in Argentina, Chile, Ecuador, and Peru during the subsequent week. "DTMF" made its debut at number 56 on the Brasil Hot 100, becoming his first ever entry in Brazil and making him the first foreign Latin artist in history to enter the chart solo.

=== Oceania ===
In New Zealand, the song made its initial entry at number 32 upon its release. After the Super Bowl LX halftime show, the song re-entered the chart at number four as its new peak. In Australia, the song debuted and peaked at number four.

=== Europe ===
"DTMF" was an instant success across the European continent, debuting straight into the top ten in Austria, France, Germany, Greece, Italy, Luxembourg, Netherlands, Poland, Spain, and Switzerland. The song debuted at number one in Luxembourg, while reaching number one during its second week in France, Greece, Italy, Portugal, Spain, and Switzerland. The song became his seventeenth number one and seventieth top ten song in Spain, extending his own record as the artist with the most number one songs in the country's history. It would also mark his first ever top ten song in Austria, Belgium, Germany, Greece, Netherlands, and Poland. In the United Kingdom, "DTMF" debuted at 45 and jumped to 26 in its second week, becoming the highest peaking Latin song in the United Kingdom of the 2020s decade, and the highest peaking Latin song overall since Luis Fonsi and Daddy Yankee's "Despacito". After the halftime show, the song reached a new peak at number four. In other European countries, "DTMF" also charted in Belgium (5), Czech Republic (5), Hungary (5), Iceland (1), Ireland (2), Latvia (1), Romania (1), Slovakia (2), and Sweden (7). The song received a Platinum certification in Spain for selling 60,000 units.

=== Global ===
Globally, it has topped the charts in over 20 countries. On the issue dated January 25, 2025, "DTMF" reached a new peak of number one on the Billboard Global 200 chart, earning 130.5 million official streams and 3,000 digital downloads worldwide. It became Bad Bunny's fourth song to top the chart. On the same issue date, it reached a peak of number two on the Billboard Global Excl. US chart, marking his 23rd top ten hit on the chart, and breaking his tie with Taylor Swift (20) for the all-time record.

== Live performances ==
Bad Bunny performed the song at the end of his Super Bowl halftime show.

== Charts ==
=== Weekly charts ===
Weekly chart performance for "DTMF"
Chart (2025–2026)	Peak position
Argentina (CAPIF)	1
Argentina Hot 100 (Billboard)	3
Australia (ARIA)	4
Austria (Ö3 Austria Top 40)	1
Belgium (Ultratop 50 Flanders)	27
Belgium (Ultratop 50 Wallonia)	5
Bolivia (Billboard)	1
Brazil Hot 100 (Billboard)	9
Brazil Latino Airplay (Crowley Charts)	1
Canada Hot 100 (Billboard)	1
Central America + Caribbean Airplay (BMAT)	1
Chile (IFPI Latin America)	1
Colombia (IFPI Latin America)	1
Costa Rica Streaming (FONOTICA)	1
Croatia (Billboard)	6
Croatia International Airplay (Top lista)	85
Czech Republic Singles Digital (ČNS IFPI)	5
Denmark (Tracklisten)	4
Dominican Republic Airplay (Monitor Latino)	4
Ecuador (Billboard)	1
El Salvador Airplay (ASAP EGC)	1
Estonia Airplay (TopHit)	27
Finland (Suomen virallinen lista)	21
France (SNEP)	1
Germany (GfK)	1
Global 200 (Billboard)	1
Greece International (IFPI)	1
Guatemala Airplay (Monitor Latino)	6
Honduras Airplay (Monitor Latino)	1
Hong Kong (Billboard)	8
Hungary (Single Top 40)	5
Iceland (Billboard)	1
Ireland (IRMA)	2
Israel (Mako Hitlist)	18
Italy (FIMI)	1
Japan Hot Overseas (Billboard Japan)	13
Latvia Streaming (LaIPA)	1
Lebanon (Lebanese Top 20)	14
Lithuania (AGATA)	1
Luxembourg (Billboard)	1
Malaysia (IFPI)	16
Malaysia International (RIM)	10
Mexico (IFPI Latin America)	1
Middle East and North Africa (IFPI)	3
Netherlands (Dutch Top 40)	21
Netherlands (Single Top 100)	2
New Zealand (Recorded Music NZ)	4
Nicaragua Airplay (Monitor Latino)	1
Nigeria (TurnTable Top 100)	42
Nigeria Airplay (TurnTable)	17
North Africa (IFPI)	9
Norway (IFPI Norge)	9
Panama International (PRODUCE)	1
Paraguay (IFPI Latin America)	1
Peru (Billboard)	1
Philippines Hot 100 (Billboard Philippines)	21
Poland (Polish Airplay Top 100)	100
Poland (Polish Streaming Top 100)	8
Portugal (AFP)	1
Romania (Billboard)	1
Singapore (RIAS)	1
Slovakia Singles Digital (ČNS IFPI)	2
South Africa Streaming (TOSAC)	53
Spain (Promusicae)	1
Suriname (Nationale Top 40)	5
Sweden (Sverigetopplistan)	7
Switzerland (Schweizer Hitparade)	1
United Arab Emirates (IFPI)	1
UK Singles (Official Charts)	4
UK Indie (Official Charts)	2
Uruguay (IFPI Latin America)	1
US Billboard Hot 100	1
US Hot Latin Rhythm Songs (Billboard)	1
US Hot Latin Songs (Billboard)	1
US Latin Airplay (Billboard)	1
US Latin Rhythm Airplay (Billboard)	1
US Pop Airplay (Billboard)	40
US Rhythmic Airplay (Billboard)	12
Venezuela Airplay (Monitor Latino)	2

=== Monthly charts ===
Monthly chart performance for "DTMF"
Chart (2025–2026)	Peak position
Brazil Streaming (Pro-Música Brasil)	24
Estonia Airplay (TopHit)	35
Lithuania Airplay (TopHit)	75
Paraguay Airplay (SPG)	8
Slovakia Singles Digital (ČNS IFPI)	40
Uruguay Streaming (CUD)	4

=== Year-end charts ===
Year-end chart performance for "DTMF"
Chart (2025)	Position
Argentina Airplay (Monitor Latino)	58
Austria (Ö3 Austria Top 40)	68
Belgium (Ultratop 50 Flanders)	141
Belgium (Ultratop 50 Wallonia)	29
Bolivia Airplay (Monitor Latino)	32
Canada (Canadian Hot 100)	80
Central America Airplay (Monitor Latino)	6
Chile Airplay (Monitor Latino)	53
Colombia Airplay (Monitor Latino)	6
Costa Rica Airplay (Monitor Latino)	67
Dominican Republic Airplay (Monitor Latino)	18
Ecuador Airplay (Monitor Latino)	14
El Salvador Airplay (ASAP EGC)	5
France (SNEP)	22
Global 200 (Billboard)	14
Guatemala Airplay (Monitor Latino)	22
Honduras Airplay (Monitor Latino)	6
Italy (FIMI)	10
Mexico Airplay (Monitor Latino)	48
Nicaragua Airplay (Monitor Latino)	7
Panama Airplay (Monitor Latino)	6
Paraguay Airplay (Monitor Latino)	24
Peru Airplay (Monitor Latino)	10
Puerto Rico Airplay (Monitor Latino)	83
Switzerland (Schweizer Hitparade)	7
Uruguay Airplay (Monitor Latino)	44
US Billboard Hot 100	51
US Hot Latin Songs (Billboard)	1
Venezuela Airplay (Monitor Latino)	26

== Certifications ==
Certifications for "DTMF"
Region	Certification	Certified units/sales
Australia (ARIA)	Gold	35,000^{‡}
Belgium (BRMA)	Platinum	40,000^{‡}
Brazil (Pro-Música Brasil)	Diamond	160,000^{‡}
Denmark (IFPI Danmark)	Gold	45,000^{‡}
France (SNEP)	Diamond	333,333^{‡}
Italy (FIMI)	2× Platinum	400,000^{‡}
New Zealand (RMNZ)	Platinum	30,000^{‡}
Norway (IFPI Norway)	Gold	30,000^{‡}
Poland (ZPAV)	Gold	62,500^{‡}
Portugal (AFP)	7× Platinum	175,000^{‡}
Spain (Promusicae)	5× Platinum	500,000^{‡}
United Kingdom (BPI)	Gold	400,000^{‡}
Streaming
Czech Republic (ČNS IFPI)	Gold	2,500,000^{†}
Greece (IFPI Greece)	2× Platinum	4,000,000^{†}
Slovakia (ČNS IFPI)	Platinum	1,700,000
^{‡} Sales+streaming figures based on certification alone.^{†} Streaming-only figures based on certification alone.

== See also ==
- 2025 in Latin music
- List of Billboard Global 200 number ones of 2025
- List of Billboard Global 200 number ones of 2026
- List of Billboard Hot 100 number ones of 2026
- List of Billboard Hot Latin Songs and Latin Airplay number ones of 2025
- List of Billboard number-one Latin rhythm songs of 2025
- List of best-selling Latin singles
- List of number-one singles of 2025 (Portugal)
- List of number-one singles of 2025 (Spain)
- List of number-one songs of 2026 (Singapore)
