= K² (band) =

- Origin: America
- Genres: Progressive rock, jazz fusion
- Years active: 2001-present
- Labels: Magna Carta Records, ProgRock Records
- Members: Ken Jaquess; Doug Sanborn; Ryo Okumoto; Steve Poloni
- Past members: Allan Holdsworth; John Miner; Yvette Devereaux; Josh Gleason; Shaun Guerin; Karl Johnson; Brent George
- Website: https://www.reverbnation.com/k2band

K² is a progressive rock band from Los Angeles, California. The band is composed of bassist/keyboardist Ken Jaquess (Atlantis, New Cross), keyboardist Ryo Okumoto (Spock's Beard, Natalie Cole), drummer Doug Sanborn (the Untouchables), electric violinist Yvette Devereaux, singer Shaun Guerin, guitarist Allan Holdsworth (Tempest, Soft Machine, Gong and U.K.) and guitarist John Miner (Art Rock Circus, Mantra Sunrise).

== History ==
K² was founded by Ken Jaquess. When Jaquess' previous group, Atlantis, disbanded in 2000, he was left with a full album's worth of new material that was originally to become Atlantis' third album. The untitled project needed a new vehicle, and Jaquess decided to take the advice of a friend and finally produce a solo album. Picking the moniker "K-Squared" or "K²", he worked on his first album for four years and released it under the name Book of the Dead.

=== Formation and first album ===
K² began in May 2001 when bassist Ken Jaquess asked drummer Doug Sanborn to contribute to some new music he was working on. Having no idea if anything would come of these sessions, they set out to record a new project. After four rehearsals and five hours of recording, Jaquess and Sanborn had laid the foundation for an album of high musicianship, complex compositions and haunting themes.

Over the next four years, Jaquess and Sandborn recruited guitarist Allan Holdsworth, vocalist Shaun Guerin, along with keyboardist Ryo Okumoto. In 2003 Jaquess and concert violinist Yvette Devereaux were live performers in John Miner's rock opera Heavens Cafe in Los Angeles at Insurgo Theater when Ken recruited them both to round out the line up for the album. After recording his vocals, original vocalist Shaun Guerin died.

Critically acclaimed around the world, K² went on to perform Book of the Dead live with a new lineup consisting of Jaquess, Sanborn (drums), Ryo Okumoto (keyboards), Karl Johnson (guitar), and Josh Gleason (vocals). In 2006, K² filmed their first gig, which was released on their 2008 concert DVD, K² Live in Hollywood.

=== Black Garden ===
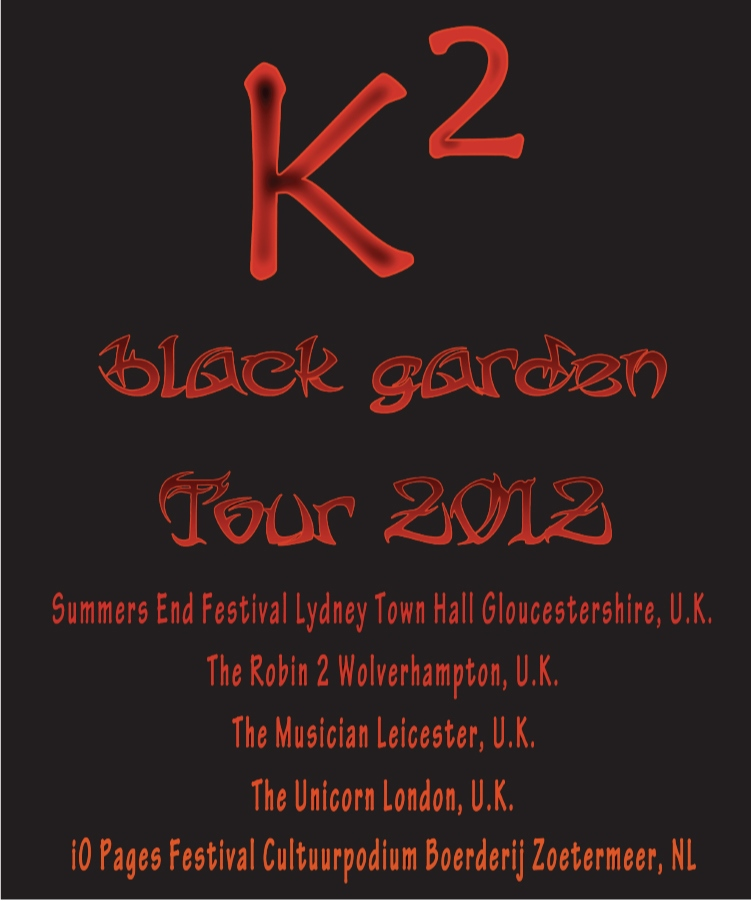
Tour 2012

In 2007, the group produced and recorded their second album, Black Garden. Released on September 21, 2010 through Magna Carta Records, this album explored new themes. With a central theme of Oceania, K² explores the depths of this region and describe rarely visited places and peoples.

K² followed this release with an East coast tour that saw the band gaining popularity.

=== Third album ===
After the tour, writing and recording of new material commenced with epics and shorter songs working their way through the band. During this time, vocalist Brent George and guitarist Steve Poloni joined the group. With this lineup change, they pursued a European tour, playing all over England and ending in the Netherlands. K²'s 2012 European tour improved their popularity and reach. It became a financial and artistic success for K². A DVD of their concert was filmed in Rotterdam at the iO Pages Festival during the tour. Originally meant to be a bonus disc for their third album, its success prompted its released as a separate DVD on September 15, 2015. Afterwards, K² were intermittently producing and recording their third album, hoping for another tour to follow in 2020, which was cancelled due to the COVID-19 pandemic. The third album remains unfinished and untitled.

== Musical style ==
K²'s music is characterized by odd-numbered time signatures, mixed meters and varied keyboard, bass and drum interplay, with an emphasis on darker, symphonic compositions.

== Members ==
Current members

- Ken Jaquess – bass guitar, keyboards (2001–present)
- Doug Sanborn – drums, percussion (2001–present)
- Ryo Okumoto – keyboards (2002–present)
- Steve Poloni – guitar (2012–present)

Former members

- Brent George – vocals (2012-2014)
- Josh Gleason – vocals (2005–2011)
- Shaun Guerin – vocals (2004)
- Allan Holdsworth – guitar (2004)
- Karl Johnson – guitar (2005–2011)
- John Miner – guitar (2004)
- Yvette Devereaux: electric violin (2004)

== Discography ==
Studio albums

- Book of the Dead (2005)
- Black Garden (2010)

DVDs

- K²-Live In Hollywood (2008)
- K²-Live @ iO Pages Festival (2015)
