= She's Back =

She's Back may refer to:

== Film ==
- She's Back (film), a 1989 film starring Carrie Fisher

== Music ==
- She's Back (Debbie Deb album), 1995
- She's Back (Dionne Warwick album), 2019
- "She's Back" (song), a 2010 song by Infinite
- "She's Back", a song by Human Nature from Walk the Tightrope
- "She's Back", a song by Westlife from Face to Face
- "She's Back", song by Ferre Grignard, B-side of 1972 single "Lazy John"
- "She's Back", song by Sexyy Red from In Sexyy We Trust
