= Tyler Reese Mehlenbacher =

American record producer (born 1993)

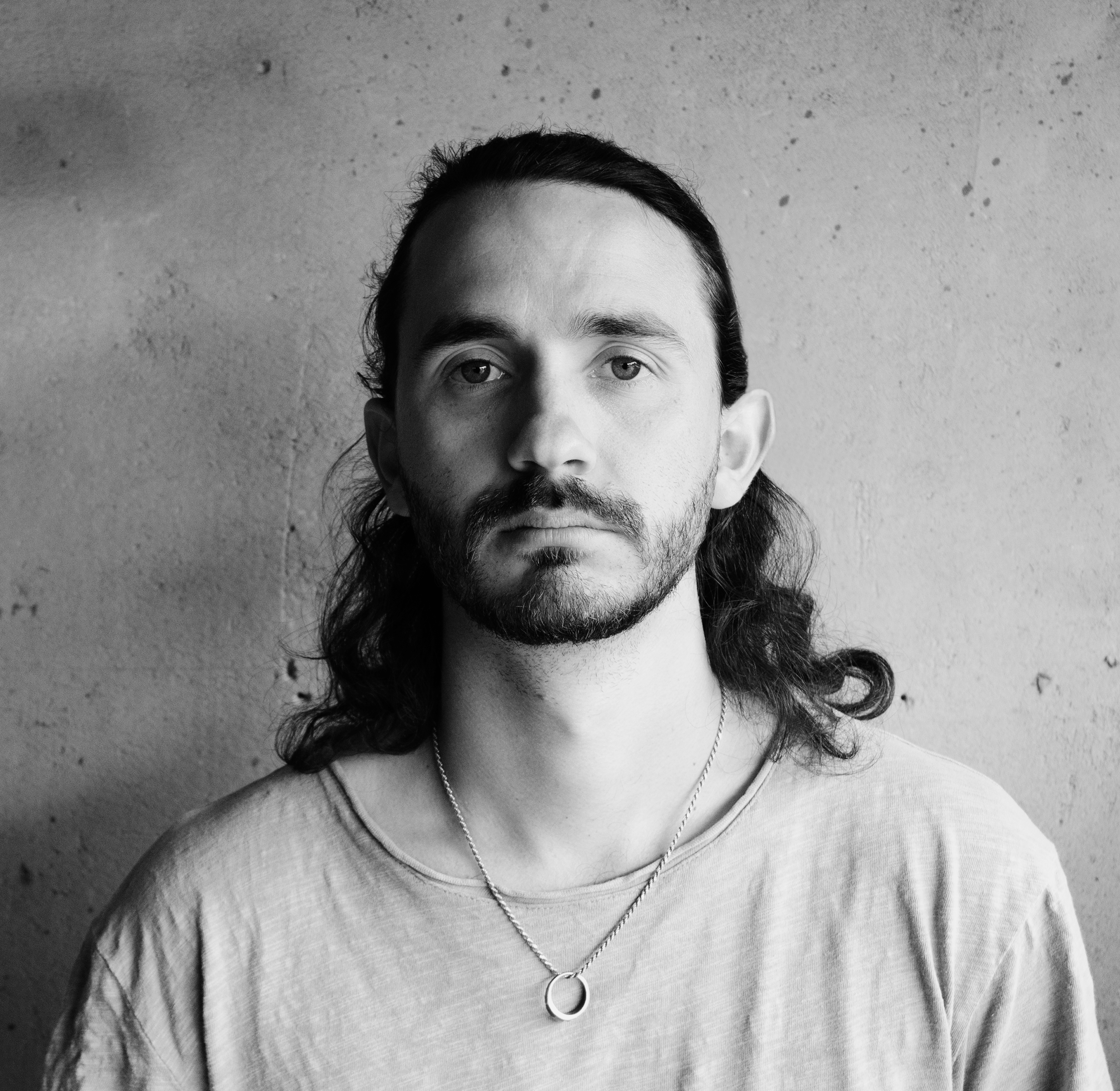

Background information
- Also known as: Tyler Reese
- Born: September 30, 1993 (age 32); Kennewick, Washington, U.S.
- Genres: Hip hop; R&B; pop; alternative; indie
- Occupations: Record producer; musician; songwriter; composer
- Instruments: Guitar; bass; keys; trumpet
- Years active: 2016–present
- Label: Primary Wave
- Formerly of: The Donuts

Tyler Reese Mehlenbacher (born September 30, 1993), known professionally as Tyler Reese, is an American record producer, songwriter, musician and composer from Richland, Washington. He first became known as one half of the music production duo The Donuts, which he formed with Sergiu Gherman. Working closely with their mentor Bēkon, The Donuts produced for notable names such as SZA, Kendrick Lamar, Hozier, H.E.R. and Joji, among others. Beginning his solo career in 2022, Reese has since produced two songs on Kendrick Lamar’s GNX ("wacced out murals" & "man at the garden") and earned a Grammy nomination for Best Score Soundtrack for Visual Media for The Color Purple (2023).

== Musical career ==
Reese discovered music production while attending Berklee College of Music where he studied Contemporary Writing and Production, and trumpet, focusing on jazz improvisation. Dropping out after two years due to being rejected from the school's Electronic Production and Design program, he began interning at The Bridge Sound & Stage in Cambridge where he learned the fundamentals of studio recording.

In 2016, Reese moved to Los Angeles and began interning for DJ Kahlil where he met Sergiu Gherman and Bekon. In 2017, Reese and Gherman formed The Donuts and co-produced "Garden (Say It Like Dat)" by SZA with their mentor Bekon. The song would receive 2× platinum certification from the RIAA, and the album, Ctrl, received a nomination for Best Urban Contemporary Album at the 2018 Grammy Awards.

In 2019, Reese produced "Fate" and "Lord is Coming" by H.E.R. on her album I Used to Know Her, earning him a nomination for Album of the Year at the 2020 Grammy Awards and a Gold certification from the RIAA.

In 2022, Reese produced "Auntie Diaries" and "Mirror" for Kendrick Lamar on his album Mr. Morale and the Big Steppers. The album received a nomination for Album of the Year and won in the Best Rap Album category at the 2023 Grammy Awards.

In 2024, Reese co-wrote "Too Sweet" by Hozier which spent several weeks at number one on various charts, including Billboard Hot 100, marking Hozier's first number one in the United States, while also topping the Adult Alternative Airplay chart for a significant period.

In 2024, Reese also produced "wacced out murals" and "man at the garden" on Kendrick Lamar's sixth studio album GNX.

== Awards and nominations ==
Award	Year	Recipient(s)	Category	Results
American Music Awards	2018	Ctrl	Favorite Album – Soul/R&B	Nominated
American Music Awards	2022	Mr. Morale & The Big Steppers	Favorite Hip Hop Album	Won
BET Awards	2018	Ctrl	Album of the Year	Nominated
BET Awards	2020	I Used to Know Her	Album of the Year	Nominated
BET Awards	2022	Mr. Morale & The Big Steppers	Album of the Year	Nominated
BET Awards	2022	Mr. Morale & The Big Steppers	Hip Hop Album of the Year	Won
Billboard Music Awards	2018	Ctrl	Top R&B Album	Nominated
Grammy Awards	2018	Ctrl	Best Urban Contemporary Album	Nominated
Grammy Awards	2020	I Used to Know Her	Album of the Year	Nominated
Grammy Awards	2023	Mr. Morale & The Big Steppers	Album of the Year	Nominated
Grammy Awards	2023	Mr. Morale & The Big Steppers	Best Rap Album	Won
People's Choice Awards	2022	Mr. Morale & The Big Steppers	The Album of 2022	Nominated

== Production and songwriting credits ==
Artist	Title	Year	Album	Peak chart positions	Certifications (RIAA)
SZA	"Garden (Say It Like Dat)"	2017	Ctrl	#20 – US Hot R&B Songs (Billboard)	2× Platinum
Higher Brothers, JID	"Do It Like Me"	2019	Five Stars		
Rich Brian	"The Sailor"	2019	The Sailor	#62 – US Billboard 200 #12 – US Independent Albums (Billboard) #31 – US Top R&B/Hip-hop Albums (Billboard)	
Rich Brian	"Rapapapa" (featuring RZA)	2019	The Sailor	#62 – US Billboard 200 #12 – US Independent Albums (Billboard) #31 – US Top R&B/Hip-hop Albums (Billboard)	
Rich Brian	"Yellow" (featuring Bekon)	2019	The Sailor	#62 – US Billboard 200 #12 – US Independent Albums (Billboard) #31 – US Top R&B/Hip-hop Albums (Billboard)	
Rich Brian	"Kids"	2019	The Sailor	#62 – US Billboard 200 #12 – US Independent Albums (Billboard) #31 – US Top R&B/Hip-hop Albums (Billboard)	
Rich Brian	"Drive Safe"	2019	The Sailor	#62 – US Billboard 200 #12 – US Independent Albums (Billboard) #31 – US Top R&B/Hip-hop Albums (Billboard)	
Rich Brian	"Confetti"	2019	The Sailor	#62 – US Billboard 200 #12 – US Independent Albums (Billboard) #31 – US Top R&B/Hip-hop Albums (Billboard)	
Rich Brian	"Vacant"	2019	The Sailor	#62 – US Billboard 200 #12 – US Independent Albums (Billboard) #31 – US Top R&B/Hip-hop Albums (Billboard)	
Rich Brian	"No Worries"	2019	The Sailor	#62 – US Billboard 200 #12 – US Independent Albums (Billboard) #31 – US Top R&B/Hip-hop Albums (Billboard)	
Rich Brian	"Curious"	2019	The Sailor	#62 – US Billboard 200 #12 – US Independent Albums (Billboard) #31 – US Top R&B/Hip-hop Albums (Billboard)	
Rich Brian	"Where Does the Time Go" (featuring Joji)	2019	The Sailor	#62 – US Billboard 200 #12 – US Independent Albums (Billboard) #31 – US Top R&B/Hip-hop Albums (Billboard)	
H.E.R.	"Lord is Coming" (featuring YBN Cordae)	2019	I Used to Know Her	#86 – US Billboard 200	Gold
H.E.R.	"Fate"	2019	I Used to Know Her	#86 – US Billboard 200	Gold
Ameer Vann	"Keep Your Distance"	2020	Single		
Rich Brian	"BALI" (featuring Guapdad 4000)	2020	Single		
Rich Brian	"Love In My Pocket"	2020	Single		
Joji	"Ew"	2020	Nectar	#1 – Australian Albums (ARIA) #3 – US Billboard 200	Gold
Joji	"High Hopes" (featuring Omar Apollo)	2020	Nectar	#1 – Australian Albums (ARIA) #3 – US Billboard 200	Gold
Joji	"Gimme Love"	2020	Single		Gold
Warren Hue, Seori	"Warriors"	2021	Shang-Chi and the Legend of the Ten Rings: The Album	#3 – US Soundtrack Albums (Billboard)	
DPR IAN, DPR LIVE, peace.	"Diamonds + And Pears"	2021	Shang-Chi and the Legend of the Ten Rings: The Album	#3 – US Soundtrack Albums (Billboard)	
JJ Lin	"Lose Control"	2021	Shang-Chi and the Legend of the Ten Rings: The Album	#3 – US Soundtrack Albums (Billboard)	
NIKI, Rich Brian, Warren Hue	"Always Rising"	2021	Shang-Chi and the Legend of the Ten Rings: The Album	#3 – US Soundtrack Albums (Billboard)	
Simu Liu	"Hot Soup"	2021	Shang-Chi and the Legend of the Ten Rings: The Album	#3 – US Soundtrack Albums (Billboard)	
Guapdad 4000, Rich Brian, Warren Hue	"Foolish"	2021	Shang-Chi and the Legend of the Ten Rings: The Album	#3 – US Soundtrack Albums (Billboard)	
EARTHGANG, Rich Brian	"Act Up"	2021	Shang-Chi and the Legend of the Ten Rings: The Album	#3 – US Soundtrack Albums (Billboard)	
Yung Bae	"Wonder" (featuring Channel Tres)	2021	Single		
NIKI	"Split"	2022	Single		
Yung Bae	"60s Spy Shit"	2022	Single		
Tanna Leone	"February"	2022	Sleepy Soldier		
Tanna Leone	"If There's a God"	2022	Sleepy Soldier		
Rich Brian	"Sunny"	2022	Brightside (EP)		
UMI	"sorry"	2022	Single		
Kendrick Lamar	"Auntie Diaries"	2022	Mr. Morale & The Big Steppers	#1 – US Billboard 200 #1 – Canadian Albums (Billboard) #1 – Australian Albums (ARIA) #2 – UK Albums (OCC)	
Kendrick Lamar	"Mirror"	2022	Mr. Morale & The Big Steppers	#1 – US Billboard 200 #1 – Canadian Albums (Billboard) #1 – Australian Albums (ARIA) #2 – UK Albums (OCC)	
Joji	"1AM Freestyle"	2022	Smithereens	#5 – US Billboard 200	
Bekon	"Famous Or Dying Again"	2023	You People (Netflix Soundtrack)		
Bekon	"Roscoes" (featuring Chakra)	2023	You People (Netflix Soundtrack)		
Bekon	"Insane"	2023	You People (Netflix Soundtrack)		
Bekon	"Famous Or Dying"	2023	You People (Netflix Soundtrack)		
Hozier	"Eat Your Young"	2023	Eat Your Young (EP)	#67 – US Billboard Hot 100	
Hozier	"First Light"	2023	Unreal Unearth	#3 – US Billboard 200 #1 – UK Albums (OCC)	
Hozier	"Damage Gets Done" (featuring Brandi Carlile)	2023	Unreal Unearth	#3 – US Billboard 200 #1 – UK Albums (OCC)	
Hozier	"Abstract (Psychopomp)"	2023	Unreal Unearth	#3 – US Billboard 200 #1 – UK Albums (OCC)	
Chenayder	"Goodbye"	2023	Single		
Coco Jones	"You See Me"	2024	The Color Purple (Original Motion Picture Soundtrack)		
Hozier	"Too Sweet"	2024	Unheard	#1 – US Billboard Hot 100 #1 – UK Singles (OCC) #1 – Australia (ARIA)	4× Platinum
Hozier	"Empire Now"	2024	Unheard	#1 – US Billboard Hot 100 #1 – UK Singles (OCC) #1 – Australia (ARIA)	4× Platinum
Sinéad Harnett	"Burn"	2024	Single		
Sinéad Harnett	"Same Rhymes	2024	Boundaries		
Sinéad Harnett	"No One"	2024	Boundaries		
Sinéad Harnett	"Spiral"	2024	Boundaries		
Kendrick Lamar	"wacced out murals"	2024	GNX	#1 – US Billboard 200 #1 – UK Albums (OCC) #1 – Canadian Albums (Billboard) #1 – Australian Albums (ARIA)	
Kendrick Lamar	"man at the garden"	2024	GNX	#1 – US Billboard 200 #1 – UK Albums (OCC) #1 – Canadian Albums (Billboard) #1 – Australian Albums (ARIA)	
Jessie Murph	"Blue Strips"	2025	Single		
Big L	"Stretch & Bob Freestyle ('98) Intro"	2025	Harlem's Finest: Return of the King		
Big L	"Stretch & Bobbito Freestyle ('98)"	2025	Harlem's Finest: Return of the King		
