= Heavens Cafe =

- Heavens Cafe live at the Flamingo Theatre, Las Vegas 1996
- Music: John Miner
- Lyrics: John Miner
- Book: John Miner
- Productions: 1996 Las Vegas; 2003 Los Angeles; 2004 Anaheim

Heavens Cafe is a rock opera written and composed by John Miner. It was first staged in Las Vegas, Nevada, in 1996. The opportunity to perform the musical theater project came after Miner's demo was heard by investor Mike Lewis of Las Vegas-based Tributary Music Label after his departure from California-based progressive rock group Mantra Sunrise. Miner established a new band, named Art rock circus with drummer Jon Weisberg and bassist Jon Cornell to stage the live performances at the Flamingo Theater in Las Vegas. Former Folies Bergère performer Kristine Keppel directed the original casting. In 2003, Los Angeles based theater director John Beane approached Miner about staging the opera in the Los Angeles area later that year. Beane's new vision for the project came to fruition in May 2004 with a six-week California run at the Insurgo Theater which included Ken Jaquess from K² (band) on bass, Yvette Devereaux violin and Nolan Stolz on drums.

== Synopsis ==
The Classical Man suffers an untimely death and arrives at an afterlife coffee house called Heavens Cafe. It is here he meets his previous self (Classical Man), his current incarnation (Lark), and his future potential self (Robin). Along his suspenseful journey through the afterlife, he is accompanied by his protective angel (Guardian Angel), and the protagonistic negative force (Devil). His alter ego (Kral, Lark spelled backwards) is the caretaker of the coffee house where much of the opera takes place. Kral also acts as the comic relief of the play. Once the lead character (Lark) leaves the cafe, he embarks on a soul-searching journey in quest of the mysterious "Tower of Information" where he hopes to find all the unanswered questions he has remaining about the meaning of life and the purpose of existence. After finding out that he cannot proceed past "The Tower," he finds himself lost without a cause, that is, until he finds the beautiful "Robin" in the play's "dream within a dream" sequence, and falls in love with her energy and beauty. They consummate their love in this place between life and death and Lark is hurled back to the next earthly reincarnation now as the baby "Robin" at the play's end.

== Analysis ==
Some critics have described Miner's rock opera as a cross between A Christmas Carol and The Wonderful Wizard of Oz. The tower itself is not a far cry from the elusive city of "OZ" and the idea of meeting different aspects of past and present would bring to mind "A Christmas Carol". Miner's dabbling in metaphysics as exemplified in earlier works from his band "Mantra Sunrise" would suggest such concepts put to rock music. The release of a CD recording of the live Las Vegas performances on the Tributary Music Label in 1998 found a healthy audience in the progressive rock music scene. The album received much attention around the world in progressive rock fanzines and radio shows. A five-page article highlighted both the Las Vegas and Los Angeles shows in the industry magazine Progression Magazine (issue #46 2004).

== Cast of characters ==
- Classical Man
- Guardian Angel
- Lark
- Robin
- Kral
- Devil

== Original cast recording (Tributary Music, 1996) ==
- Lark (Todd Ashmore)
- Robin (Allison Gifford)
- Kral (Timothy Burris)
- Classical Man (Sean Critchfield)
- Guardian Angel (Miché)
- Devil (The Dark One) (Joshua Musicant, credited as Josh)

Art Rock Circus

- Guitar (John Miner)
- Bass (John Cornell)
- Drums (John Weisberg)
- Violin (Melanie Grimmett)

Choreography

- Kristine Keppel
