= Man at the Garden =

2024 song by Kendrick Lamar

Song by Kendrick Lamar

from the album GNX
- Released: November 22, 2024
- Genre: Hip-hop
- Length: 3:53
- Label: PGLang; Interscope
- Songwriters: Kendrick Duckworth; Mark Spears; Jack Antonoff; Craig Balmoris; Tyler Mehlenbacher; Matthew Bernard
- Producers: Sounwave; Antonoff; Balmoris; Tyler Reese; M-Tech (add.)

GNX track listing
- 12 tracks: 1. "Wacced Out Murals"; 2. "Squabble Up"; 3. "Luther"; 4. "Man at the Garden"; 5. "Hey Now"; 6. "Reincarnated"; 7. "TV Off"; 8. "Dodger Blue"; 9. "Peekaboo"; 10. "Heart Pt. 6"; 11. "GNX"; 12. "Gloria"

"Man at the Garden" (stylized in all lowercase) is a song by American rapper Kendrick Lamar from his sixth studio album, GNX (2024). It was produced by Sounwave, Jack Antonoff, Craig Balmoris (of Best Kept Secret) and Tyler Reese Mehlenbacher, with additional production from Matthew "M-Tech" Bernard. The song contains an interpolation of "One Mic" by Nas.

== Composition and lyrics ==
The instrumental is composed of a "lush, moody synthscape". Lyrically, the song revolves around Kendrick Lamar's conviction that he deserves all of his accolades and material rewards, as he details the accomplishments, hard work, sacrifices, trials and tribulations of his life and career, repeatedly declaring the phrase "I deserve it all". He additionally expresses anger and resentment at his enemies: "I did it with integrity and niggas still try to hate on me / Just wait and see, more blood will be spillin', it's just paint to me". Lamar ends the song with the rhetorical question, "Tell me why you think you deserve the greatest of all time, motherfucker?"

== Critical reception ==
Michael Saponara of Billboard ranked it as the seventh best song from GNX.

== Personnel ==
- Kendrick Lamar – vocals, writing
- Sounwave – producer, programming, piano, synthesizers, arrangement
- Jack Antonoff – producer, programming, bass, keyboards, synthesizers, engineer
- Tyler Reese – producer, drums, keyboards, bass, synthesizers
- Craig Balmoris – producer, drums, keyboards, bass, synthesizers
- M-Tech – additional production
- Sam Dew – background vocals
- Ray Charles Brown Jr. – engineer
- Johnathan Turner – engineer
- Laura Sisk – engineer
- Oli Jacobs – engineer, mixing
- Ruairi O'Flaherty – mastering

== Charts ==
=== Weekly charts ===
Weekly chart performance for "Man at the Garden"
Chart (2024)	Peak position
Australia (ARIA)	29
Australia Hip Hop/R&B (ARIA)	8
Canada Hot 100 (Billboard)	25
Global 200 (Billboard)	13
Israel (Mako Hitlist)	86
Latvia Streaming (LaIPA)	19
Lithuania (AGATA)	19
New Zealand (Recorded Music NZ)	21
South Africa (Billboard)	6
Sweden (Sverigetopplistan)	77
UK Streaming (OCC)	44
US Billboard Hot 100	9
US Hot R&B/Hip-Hop Songs (Billboard)	7

=== Year-end charts ===
Year-end chart performance for "Man at the Garden"
Chart (2025)	Position
US Hot R&B/Hip-Hop Songs (Billboard)	67
