= Die Hard (song) =

2022 single by Kendrick Lamar, Blxst, and Amanda Reifer

Single by Kendrick Lamar, Blxst, and Amanda Reifer

from the album Mr. Morale & the Big Steppers
- Released: August 9, 2022
- Recorded: April 2022
- Genre: Pop; R&B
- Length: 3:59
- Label: PGLang; TDE; Aftermath; Interscope
- Songwriters: Kendrick Duckworth; Matthew Burdette; Amanda Reifer; Mark Spears; Dacoury Natche; Hykeem Carter, Jr.; Jason Pounds; Michael Mulé; Isaac De Boni; Sam Dew; Stephen Bruner; Marvin Eugene Smith; Robert T. "Bob" Smith; Victor Ekpo
- Producers: Sounwave; DJ Dahi; Baby Keem; J. Lbs

Kendrick Lamar singles chronology
"Silent Hill" (2022)	"Die Hard" (2022)	"America Has a Problem" (2023)

Blxst singles chronology
"Stoppin" (2022)	"Die Hard" (2022)	"Spend It" (2022)

Amanda Reifer singles chronology
"Crazy" (2022)	"Die Hard" (2022)

"Die Hard" is a song by American rappers Kendrick Lamar, Blxst, and Bajan singer Amanda Reifer of the disbanded Cover Drive. It was sent to rhythmic contemporary radio on August 9, 2022, as the third single from the former's fifth studio album, Mr. Morale & the Big Steppers. The song was produced by Sounwave, DJ Dahi, and Lamar's cousin Baby Keem, with co-production by FnZ.

== Composition and lyrics ==
"Die Hard" is an R&B and pop song that contains a post-chorus that is sung by Amanda Reifer. The song includes a "floating R&B instrumental and tender introspection". Lamar raps: "I got some regrets". It has a "gentle flute line and a blissful melody", which sees Blxst sing on the chorus: "I hope I'm not too late to set my demons straight". In the two verses of the song, Kendrick Lamar uses two different moods as the song about how it is never too late to turn wrongs into rights and chasing dreams. However, it can also be interpreted as a song directed to his wife, Whitney. With the lyrics,

Do you love me? Do you trust me?
Can I trust you? Don't judge me

it can show that Kendrick may be fearful about opening up about the Big 'Truth' which was mentioned in previous songs in the album, which is referenced multiple times in Die Hard, especially with this line: "My truth too complicated to hide now", showing he might decide to open up, compared to his previous attitude towards this 'Truth'.

It samples vocals from Kadhja Bonet's "Remember the Rain".

== Credits and personnel ==
- Kendrick Lamar – vocals, songwriting
- Blxst – vocals, songwriting
- Boi-1da – production, songwriting
- Sounwave – production, songwriting
- DJ Dahi – production, songwriting
- Baby Keem – production, songwriting, drums
- J. Lbs – production, songwriting
- FnZ
  - Michael Mulé – co-production, songwriting
  - Isaac De Boni – co-production, songwriting
- Sam Dew – songwriting
- Thundercat – songwriting, bass
- Marvin Eugene Smith – songwriting
- Robert T. "Bob" Smith – songwriting
- Victor Ekpo – songwriting
- Grandmaster Vic – strings
- Manny Marroquin – mixing
- Anthony Vilchis – mixing assistance
- Trey Station – mixing assistance
- Zach Pereyra – mixing assistance
- Andrew Boyd – recording assistance
- Wesley Seidman – recording assistance
- Joe Visciano – engineering
- Beach Noise
  - Matt Schaeffer – engineering
  - Johnny Kosich – engineering
- Johnathan Turner – engineering
- Ray Charles Brown, Jr. – engineering

== Charts ==
=== Weekly charts ===
Weekly chart performance for "Die Hard"
Chart (2022)	Peak position
Australia (ARIA)	5
Austria (Ö3 Austria Top 40)	41
Belgium (Ultratop 50 Flanders)	50
Canada Hot 100 (Billboard)	5
Denmark (Tracklisten)	22
France (SNEP)	32
Global 200 (Billboard)	7
Ireland (IRMA)	6
Lithuania (AGATA)	18
Netherlands (Single Top 100)	39
New Zealand (Recorded Music NZ)	6
Norway (VG-lista)	30
Portugal (AFP)	13
Slovakia (Singles Digitál Top 100)	34
South Africa Streaming (TOSAC)	2
Sweden (Sverigetopplistan)	23
Switzerland (Schweizer Hitparade)	13
UK Singles (OCC)	7
UK Hip Hop/R&B (OCC)	3
US Billboard Hot 100	5
US Hot R&B/Hip-Hop Songs (Billboard)	4
US Rhythmic Airplay (Billboard)	16

=== Year-end charts ===
2022 year-end chart performance for "Die Hard"
Chart (2022)	Position
US Hot R&B/Hip-Hop Songs (Billboard)	48

== Certifications ==
Certifications for "Die Hard"
Region	Certification	Certified units/sales
Australia (ARIA)	Platinum	70,000^{‡}
United Kingdom (BPI)	Silver	200,000^{‡}
^{‡} Sales+streaming figures based on certification alone.

== Release history ==
Release history for "Die Hard"
Region	Date	Format	Label	Ref.
United States	August 9, 2022	Rhythmic contemporary radio	PGLang; TDE; Aftermath; Interscope	
