= GNX (album) =

Studio album by Kendrick Lamar
- Released: November 22, 2024
- Recorded: 2022–2024
- Studios: Conway Recording (Hollywood); Electric Lady (New York City); Glenwood Place Recording (Burbank); Tamarind (Los Angeles); Pen Station (Los Angeles); Pleasure Hill (Portland); Sunset Sound (Hollywood)
- Genre: West Coast hip-hop
- Length: 44:20
- Languages: English; Spanish
- Labels: PGLang; Interscope
- Producers: Kendrick Lamar; Jack Antonoff; Craig Balmoris; Scott Bridgeway; Dahi; Deats; Noah Ehler; Frano; Juju the Fool; Larry Jayy; Kenny & Billy; Rose Lilah; Tim Maxey; Sean Momberger; M-Tech; Mustard; Rascal; Sounwave; Tyler Reese; Tane Runo; Kamasi Washington

Kendrick Lamar chronology
Mr. Morale & the Big Steppers (2022)	GNX (2024)

Singles from GNX
- 1. "Squabble Up / TV Off" Released: November 26, 2024; 2. "Luther" Released: November 29, 2024; 3. "Peekaboo" Released: February 26, 2025

GNX is the sixth studio album by the American rapper Kendrick Lamar. It was surprise-released on November 22, 2024, through PGLang and Interscope Records. The album features guest appearances from SZA, Lefty Gunplay, Wallie the Sensei, Roddy Ricch, AzChike, Hitta J3, and more. Lamar produced the album primarily with Sounwave and Jack Antonoff; other producers include Mustard, Sean Momberger, and Kamasi Washington.

Titled after the Buick Regal model, GNX is Lamar's first album to be released after his departure from longtime labels Top Dawg Entertainment and Aftermath Entertainment. GNX was released to widespread acclaim. Multiple critics hailed it as a successful reimagination of West Coast hip-hop and one of the best albums of 2024. The album was Lamar's fifth number one on the US Billboard 200 chart. It also topped the charts in numerous countries, including Canada, Netherlands, Sweden, Australia, Denmark, and the UK; and top five in Poland, Nigeria, France, and Hungary.

GNX was supported by four singles: the Billboard Hot 100 number ones "Squabble Up" and "Luther", the number two hit "TV Off", and "Peekaboo". Lamar and SZA performed live at the Super Bowl LIX halftime show and embarked on the co-headlining Grand National Tour in 2025 to promote the album as well as SZA's Lana.

The album and its songs received eight nominations at the 68th Grammy Awards, including Album of the Year, winning four for Best Rap Album, with "Luther" winning Record of the Year and Best Melodic Rap Performance while "TV Off" won Best Rap Song. With these wins, Lamar became the most awarded rapper in Grammy history with 27 career wins.

== Background ==
Kendrick Lamar released his fifth studio album, Mr. Morale & the Big Steppers, on May 13, 2022, to critical and commercial success. He began working on GNX immediately afterwards in collaboration with music producers Sounwave and Jack Antonoff. Together, they recorded around 80 to 100 songs for the album in the next few years at the studio, with twelve tracks being used in the final album. After concluding The Big Steppers Tour in March 2024, Lamar shared on social media that he had purchased a vintage, limited-run 1987 Buick Grand National Experimental (GNX), a high-spec version of the same model that his father used to take him home from the hospital following his birth.

Mr. Morale & the Big Steppers was Lamar's last album with Top Dawg Entertainment (TDE), to which he had signed in 2005. Mr. Morale & the Big Steppers was also Lamar's first album with his own company PGLang. Before his feud with Canadian rapper Drake re-escalated, he quietly departed from Aftermath Entertainment and signed a direct licensing agreement with its distributor, Interscope Records. (Note: Pre-GNX releases under this deal hold the copyright notice "Kendrick Lamar under exclusive license to Interscope Records" which means that Lamar himself owns ultimate copyrights for those recordings; however on GNX, it says "pgLang under exclusive license to Interscope Records", thus meaning the deal was renegotiated, and Lamar's own management company, PGLang, is now set as an ultimate copyright owner for all official post-"Not Like Us" releases.) Lamar released five standalone singles during the latest installment of their conflict, including the Billboard Hot 100-toppers "Like That" and "Not Like Us". The rapper teased a then-untitled song in the beginning of the music video for the latter. Entertainment Weekly observed its inclusion and fan speculation that it could be included in his next album; the song was revealed to be "Squabble Up".

Rumors surrounding Lamar's forthcoming album began to emerge, with some being denied by close affiliates. After announcing that he was chosen as the headlining act for the Super Bowl LIX halftime show, Lamar surprise-released "Watch the Party Die" on his Instagram account. Rolling Stone said that the track bodes well for his next album–"whenever it comes". Dazed, on the other hand, predicted that he was gearing up for an "astronomical" era. By October, Lamar's longtime collaborators Terrace Martin, SZA, and Schoolboy Q confirmed that he would be releasing new music.

== Composition ==
GNX consists of 12 songs and has a running time of 44 minutes and 20 seconds, the shortest studio album of Lamar's career. Although no tracks from his feud with Drake are included, its sentiment "still looms over the album", according to Vulture. It is a West Coast hip-hop album, drawing on both classic and contemporary conventions of the genre. According to Rolling Stone, the album is a tribute to Lamar's native Los Angeles, prominently infusing G-funk throughout its compositions.

The regional Mexican music and mariachi singer Deyra Barrera is featured on three songs, both the opening and closing tracks as well as "Reincarnated", Lamar having discovered the singer when she performed at a Los Angeles Dodgers World Series game that he attended in 2024. The production team played Barrera the instrumentation arrangements, and gave her a description of the emotions Lamar wanted to evoke throughout the album.

=== Songs ===
"Squabble Up"
The second song on the album, "Squabble Up" prominently features a sample of the 1980s freestyle song "When I Hear Music" by Debbie Deb.

"Wacced Out Murals" opens the album with Lamar addressing the reactions to his announcement as the Super Bowl LIX halftime show headliner, additionally namedropping Nas, Snoop Dogg, and Lil Wayne. Jonah Kreuger of Consequence described it as "fiery" and "intensely confrontational". "Squabble Up" features a performance of "myriad voices, octave changes, and shrieks" that sound as though "he's on the precipice of losing control", according to Matthew Ritchie of Pitchfork; it has been compared to the work of the late Drakeo the Ruler. "Luther" has been described as a "noticeably tender moment" on the album, with lyrics about imagining a better future for one's loved ones; it features a prominent sample of Marvin Gaye's 1967 song "If This World Were Mine" sang by the titular Luther Vandross. On "Man at the Garden", Lamar details the trials and tribulations of his career, repeatedly declaring that he "deserve[s] it all". "Hey Now" features elements of bounce music and multiple lines possibly alluding to his feud with Drake. Built off the instrumental of "Made Niggaz" by Tupac Shakur, "Reincarnated" sees Lamar present himself in the perspectives of musicians John Lee Hooker and Billie Holiday before the lyrics transition to him having a conversation with God.

"TV Off"
The seventh track on the album, "TV Off" features a sample of "The Black Hole – Overture" by John Barry, used for the chorus.

"TV Off" features "clipped strings" that "dissolve into Viking-berserker horns" halfway through. As the percussion of the second part fades in, Lamar is heard "animatedly" screaming Mustard's name; this has since become an Internet meme. "Dodger Blue" is a tribute to the culture of Los Angeles with dominant elements of G-funk. "Peekaboo" features "skeletal but bouncy" production; Variety described Lamar's lyrics as being "layered in eccentric wit and convincing menace". On "Heart Pt. 6", he recounts his history with TDE and the supergroup Black Hippy, acknowledging his role in the group falling apart due to creative differences. Ben Sisario of The New York Times noted that it is an "implicit rejoinder" to Drake's diss track of the same name, which in itself was taken from Lamar's "The Heart" song series. The title track, "GNX", features Los Angeles rappers Peysoh, Hitta J3, and YoungThreat. Lamar does not have a verse, instead providing a hook questioning "who put the West back in front of shit?" On "Gloria", Lamar discusses his relationship with his personified pen as an ode to writing music; multiple critics noted its similarity to "I Used to Love H.E.R." by Common and "I Gave You Power" by Nas.

== Promotion and release ==
On November 22, 2024, Lamar unexpectedly premiered a one-minute teaser for GNX on YouTube and Instagram. The video contained a snippet of an unreleased and untitled song, which the media has tentatively called "Bodies". GNX was surprise-released through PGLang and Interscope Records 30 minutes later.

On December 3, 2024, Lamar and SZA announced the Grand National Tour in support of the album. The tour began on April 19, 2025, in Minneapolis and concluded on December 11, 2025, in Sydney, Australia.

On February 9, 2025, Lamar performed GNX songs "Luther", "Man at the Garden", "Peekaboo", "Squabble Up", and "TV Off" during the Super Bowl LIX halftime show. The performance drew in 133.5 million viewers, making it the most watched Super Bowl halftime show in history.

== Critical reception ==
GNX ratings
Aggregate scores
Source	Rating
AnyDecentMusic?	8.5/10
Metacritic	87/100
Review scores
Source	Rating
AllMusic	4.5/5 stars
Clash	9/10
Consequence	B+
Dork	5/5 stars
Exclaim!	9/10
The Guardian	4/5 stars
NME	5/5 stars
Paste	9.1/10
Pitchfork	6.6/10
Rolling Stone	4/5 stars

Upon release, GNX received widespread critical acclaim from music critics. According to the review aggregator Metacritic, GNX received "universal acclaim" based on a weighted average score of 87 out of 100 from 22 critic scores.

Various reviews considered it a victory lap for Lamar after his hip-hop feuds throughout 2024. Critics for Exclaim! and Variety praised the album's tributes to West Coast hip-hop and Lamar's abilities to distill various elements to create a cohesive record. Paste's Matt Mitchell upheld the album as a reimagination of rap's future and Lamar's past, and NME's Kyann-Sian Williams was impressed by the warm storytelling that acted as a palate cleanser after the diss tracks and loathing that had dominated the hip-hop scene. Williams contended that GNX is an "easy contender for the rap album of 2024", and Tom Breihan of Stereogum hailed it as the year's best record and Lamar's "greatest work" yet.

Many critics focused on Lamar's self-depiction as a driving cultural force in hip-hop. Alexis Petridis of The Guardian commented that GNX found Lamar at his most confrontational, "deferring only to God". In The Line of Best Fit, Matthew Kim described it as "a concise statement of regional pride, braggadocio, and non-conformity", crediting Jack Antonoff's production for making the album feel "lush and expansive". Rolling Stone's Mosi Reeves felt that GNX provided more than sufficient explanations for why Lamar is the "GOAT of 2024" but not answers to a bigger cultural question of structural changes in hip-hop, labelling the album "yet another treatise on hip-hop corporatism". Concluding the review for AllMusic, David Crone made several claims about the album, calling it, "a pillar of reflective realness, a flag planted in the lineage of Black musical visionaries, a silhouette of the West Coast in the high beams of fame – and Kendrick's most speaker-knocking set to date."

The minority of mixed reviews, coming from Pitchfork and critics like Robert Christgau and Will Hodgkinson, acclaimed Lamar's rap delivery and production, but felt his self-bragging, emphasis on brand names, and clean, synthetic sound overtook the authenticity and provocative intellectual themes of his past albums. Jon Caramanica of The New York Times considered Lamar's tribute to his California roots somewhat a retreat to his "comfort zone", calling the album "impressive but slight".

== Awards and nominations ==
Several publications listed GNX as among the best albums of 2024, such as NPR, the Associated Press, NME, and Rolling Stone. It was the number-one best for Complex, in the top five for The A.V. Club, Billboard, the The Washington Post, and Variety, and the top-50 of several magazines and blogs notable for their coverage of underground music, such as BrooklynVegan and Consequence, and newspapers like The Independent and Los Angeles Times.

At the 68th Grammy Awards, GNX won the award for Best Rap Album and was nominated for Album of the Year, losing to Debí Tirar Más Fotos by Bad Bunny. At the American Music Awards of 2025, Lamar had the highest quantity of nominations with ten, two of them, the Album of the Year introduced in this year's ceremony and Favorite Hip-Hop Album, for GNX. It won the Album of the Year at the 2025 BET Awards ceremony, and was nominated for the same type of award at the 2025 MTV Video Music Awards, losing to Short n' Sweet by Sabrina Carpenter.

== Commercial performance ==
GNX earned over 44.2 million first-day streams on the global Spotify chart, averaging over 3.6 million streams per song despite being available only seven hours prior. It also simultaneously occupied the top two slots on the American Spotify charts, with "Squabble Up" being at number one with 3.272 million streams. GNX became Lamar's second number-one album on the UK Albums Chart after To Pimp a Butterfly (2015).

In the United States, GNX debuted atop the Billboard 200 with 319,000 album-equivalent units, including 379.72 million official on-demand streams and 32,000 pure sales, despite only being available via streaming and standard digital downloads. It crossed 500,000 album-equivalent units by the second week. It marked Lamar's fifth consecutive number-one album in the country and scored the sixth-largest opening week of 2024, among all albums. Furthermore, GNX logged the year's biggest streaming week for any hip-hop or R&B album, the second-biggest debut streaming week, and the third-largest streaming week overall, only behind Taylor Swift's The Tortured Poets Department. All 12 songs from GNX debuted on the Billboard Hot 100 chart, occupying the entire top five simultaneously. Lamar is the fifth artist in history to monopolize the premier spots, joining Ariana Grande, Swift, Drake, and the Beatles. Following Lamar's Super Bowl Halftime Show performance, GNX returned to the number 1 spot on the Billboard 200 chart dated February 22, 2025.

Elsewhere, GNX debuted at number one in Canada, Australia, and the United Kingdom.

== Track listing ==
Credits adapted from album liner notes and Tidal.

GNX track listing
No.	Title	Writer(s)	Producer(s)	Length
1.	"Wacced Out Murals"	Kendrick Duckworth; Mark Spears; Jack Antonoff; Dacoury Natche; Craig Balmoris; Frano Huett; Tyler Mehlenbacher	Sounwave; Antonoff; Dahi; Balmoris; Frano; Tyler Reese; M-Tech^{[a]}; Tim Maxey^{[a]}	5:17
2.	"Squabble Up"	Duckworth; Spears; Antonoff; Scott Bridgeway; Tony Butler^{[b]}	Sounwave; Antonoff; Kendrick Lamar; Bridgeway; M-Tech^{[a]}	2:37
3.	"Luther" (with SZA)	Duckworth; Solána Rowe; Spears; Antonoff; Bridgeway; Kamasi Washington; Matthew Bernard; Roshwita Bacha; Atia Boggs; Samuel Dew; Marvin Gaye^{[c]}	Sounwave; Antonoff; Bridgeway; Washington; M-Tech; Rose Lilah	2:57
4.	"Man at the Garden"	Duckworth; Spears; Antonoff; Balmoris; Mehlenbacher	Sounwave; Antonoff; Balmoris; Reese; M-Tech^{[a]}	3:53
5.	"Hey Now" (featuring Dody6)	Duckworth; Zarius Cunningham; Spears; Antonoff; Dijon McFarlane; Barry Adams; Lefabian Williams^{[d]}	Sounwave; Antonoff; Mustard	3:37
6.	"Reincarnated"	Duckworth; Spears; Antonoff; Bernard; Noah Ehler; Tupac Shakur^{[e]}; Malcolm Greenridge^{[e]}; Yafau Fula^{[e]}; Bruce Washington^{[e]}; Katari Cox^{[e]}; Mutah Beale^{[e]}	Sounwave; Antonoff; Lamar; M-Tech; Ehler	4:35
7.	"TV Off" (featuring Lefty Gunplay)	Duckworth; Franklin Holladay; Spears; Antonoff; McFarlane; Washington; Sean Momberger; Larry Sanders; Jimmy Webb^{[f]}; John Barry^{[f]}; Christopher Wallace^{[f]}; Jalacy Hawkins^{[f]}; Christopher Martin^{[f]}	Sounwave; Antonoff; Mustard; Washington; Momberger; Larry Jayy	3:40
8.	"Dodger Blue" (featuring Wallie the Sensei, Siete7x, and Roddy Ricch)	Duckworth; Traquan Tyson; Craig Johnson, Jr.; Rodrick Moore, Jr.; Spears; Antonoff; Taji Ausar; Timothy Maxey; Dew	Sounwave; Antonoff; Tane Runo; Maxey; Terrace Martin^{[a]}	2:11
9.	"Peekaboo" (featuring AzChike)	Duckworth; Damaria Walker; Spears; Bridgeway; Momberger; Willie Hale^{[g]}; Willie Clarke^{[g]}; Michel Legrand^{[g]}	Sounwave; Bridgeway; Momberger	2:35
10.	"Heart Pt. 6"	Duckworth; Spears; Antonoff; Chad Hugo^{[h]}; Pharrell Williams^{[h]}; Tammy Lucas^{[h]}	Sounwave; Antonoff; M-Tech^{[a]}; Juju the Fool^{[a]}	4:52
11.	"GNX" (featuring Hitta J3, YoungThreat, and Peysoh)	Duckworth; Dominicke Williams; Deonta Simuel; Kevin Oropeza; Spears; Antonoff; Kenneth Gnanasundaram; Billy Gnanasundaram; Tobias Breuer	Sounwave; Antonoff; Kenny & Billy; Rascal; Maxey^{[a]}	3:13
12.	"Gloria" (with SZA)	Duckworth; Rowe; Spears; Antonoff; Dominik Patrzek; Boggs; Jorge Castañeda^{[i]}	Sounwave; Antonoff; Deats	4:47
Total length:				44:20

Notes

- ^{^[a]} signifies an additional producer.
- All tracks are stylized in lower case.

Sample and interpolation credits

- ^{^[b]}"Squabble Up" contains a sample of "When I Hear Music", composed by Tony Butler, as performed by Debbie Deb.
- ^{^[c]}"Luther" contains a sample of "If This World Were Mine", written by Marvin Gaye, as performed by Luther Vandross and Cheryl Lynn.
- "Man at the Garden" contains an uncredited interpolation of "One Mic", written by Nasir Jones and Chucky Thompson, as performed by Nas.
- ^{^[d]}"Hey Now" contains an interpolation of "Scotty", written by Carlos Walker and Lefabian Williams, as performed by D4L.
- ^{^[e]}"Reincarnated" contains a sample of "Made Niggaz", written and performed by Tupac Shakur featuring Outlawz.
- ^{^[f]}"TV Off" contains:
  - samples of "MacArthur Park", written by Jimmy Webb, as performed by Monk Higgins, and "The Black Hole – Overture", composed by John Barry.
  - an interpolation of "Kick in the Door", written by Christopher Wallace, Jalacy Hawkins, and Christopher Martin, as performed by the Notorious B.I.G..
- ^{^[g]}"Peekaboo" contains samples of "Give a Helping Hand", written by Willie Clarke and Willie Hale, as performed by Little Beaver, and "Blue Revery", written by Michel Legrand, as performed by Grille-Chemand.
- ^{^[h]}"Heart Pt. 6" contains a sample of "Use Your Heart", written by Chad Hugo, Pharrell Williams, and Tammy Lucas, as performed by SWV.
- ^{^[i]}"Gloria" contains a sample of "Amarga Tristeza", written by Jorge Castañeda, as performed by Combo Impacto.

== Personnel ==
Credits adapted from album liner notes and Tidal.

=== Vocalists ===
- Kendrick Lamar – vocals
- Deyra Barrera – additional vocals (tracks 1, 6, 12)
- The Aeolians of Oakwood University Choir – choir vocals (track 1)
- Ink – background vocals (tracks 2, 10), additional vocals (8)
- Sam Dew – background vocals (tracks 2, 4–6, 8, 10, 12), additional vocals (3)
- Lefty Gunplay – additional vocals (track 7)
- Roddy Ricch – additional vocals (track 8)
- AZ Chike – vocals (track 9)

=== Additional musicians ===
- Kamasi Washington – conductor for strings (track 3)
- Paul Cartwright – strings (track 3), violin (7)
- Caleb Vaughn Smith – strings (track 3)
- Drew Forde – strings (track 3)
- Geoff Gallegos – strings (track 3)
- Giovanna Moraga – strings (track 3)
- Kerenza Peacock – strings (track 3)
- Luanne Homzy – strings (track 3)
- Luke Maurer – strings (track 3)
- Stephanie Payne – strings (track 3)
- Stephanie Yu – strings (track 3)
- Evan Smith – baritone saxophone, tenor saxophone (track 7)
- Miles Mosley – bass (track 7)
- Peter Jacobson – cello (track 7)
- Amber Wyman – horn (track 7)
- Malik Taylor – horn (track 7)
- Rickey Washington – horn (track 7)
- Ryan Porter – horn (track 7)
- Sean Sonderegger – horn (track 7)
- Serafin Aguilar – horn (track 7)
- Zem Audu – tenor saxophone (track 7)
- Chad Jackson – violin (track 7)
- Marta Honer – violin (track 7)
- Reiko Nakano – violin (track 7)
- Tylana Renga – violin (track 7)
- Yvette Devereaux – violin (track 7)
- Bobby Hawk – violin (tracks 10, 12)

==== Technical ====
- Sounwave – programming (tracks 1 – 5, 10, 12), arrangement (tracks 1 – 5, 9 – 12), string arrangement (tracks 3, 7), piano, synths (track 4)
- Jack Antonoff – programming, keys (tracks 1 – 5, 7, 8, 10), percussion (tracks 1, 2, 8, 10), acoustic guitar (tracks 1, 10, 12), cello (track 1), guitar (tracks 2, 3), marxophone, Mellotron (track 3), bass (track 4), electric guitar (track 10), string arrangement (tracks 10, 12)
- M-Tech – ambient synth, keys (track 1), Rhodes piano, 808 (track 3)
- Dahi – drums, programming, keys, synths (track 1)
- Frano – keys, synths (track 1)
- Armand Hutton – choir arranger (track 1)
- Scott Bridgeway – drums (tracks 2, 3), programming (tracks 2, 3, 9)
- Tyler Reese – drums, bass, keys, synths (track 4)
- Craig Balmoris – drums, bass, keys, synths (track 4)
- Mustard – programming (tracks 5, 7), keys, drums (track 5)
- Sean Momberger – programming (track 7), melody (track 9)
- Tim Maxey – programming, guitar, synths, bass, drums (track 8)
- Tane Runo – programming, guitar, synths, bass, drums (track 8)
- Rascal – piano, synthesizer (track 11)
- Kenny & Billy – piano loop (track 11)

=== Technical personnel ===
- Ruairi O'Flaherty – mastering
- Oli Jacobs – mixing, engineering
- Johnathan Turner – engineering
- Laura Sisk – engineering
- Ray Charles Brown Jr. – engineering
- Jack Antonoff – engineering
- Dani Perez – engineering (tracks 1, 2, 3, 5, 8, 12)
- Jack Manning – engineering (tracks 1, 2, 3, 5, 8, 12)
- Sebastian Owen Jones – engineering (tracks 2, 5)
- Jozef Caldwell – engineering (tracks 4, 6, 7, 10)
- Tony Austin – engineering (tracks 3, 7)
- Zem Audu – engineering (track 7)
- Joey Miller – engineering (tracks 6, 7)

== Charts ==
=== Weekly charts ===
Weekly chart performance
Chart (2024–2025)	Peak position
Australian Albums (ARIA)	1
Australian Hip Hop/R&B Albums (ARIA)	1
Austrian Albums (Ö3 Austria)	2
Belgian Albums (Ultratop Flanders)	1
Belgian Albums (Ultratop Wallonia)	2
Canadian Albums (Billboard)	1
Croatian International Albums (HDU)	13
Czech Albums (ČNS IFPI)	6
Danish Albums (Hitlisten)	1
Dutch Albums (Album Top 100)	1
Finnish Albums (Suomen virallinen lista)	7
French Albums (SNEP)	5
German Albums (Offizielle Top 100)	4
Greek Albums (IFPI)	1
Hungarian Albums (MAHASZ)	2
Icelandic Albums (Tónlistinn)	2
Irish Albums (Official Charts)	1
Italian Albums (FIMI)	5
Japanese Albums (Oricon)	22
Japanese Combined Albums (Oricon)	23
Japanese Dance & Soul Albums (Oricon)	1
Japanese Hot Albums (Billboard Japan)	23
Lithuanian Albums (AGATA)	1
New Zealand Albums (RMNZ)	1
Nigerian Albums (TurnTable)	4
Norwegian Albums (VG-lista)	1
Polish Albums (ZPAV)	3
Portuguese Albums (AFP)	1
Scottish Albums (Official Charts)	4
Slovak Albums (ČNS IFPI)	5
Spanish Albums (PROMUSICAE)	8
Swedish Albums (Sverigetopplistan)	1
Swiss Albums (Schweizer Hitparade)	2
UK Albums (Official Charts)	1
UK R&B Albums (Official Charts)	1
US Billboard 200	1
US Top R&B/Hip-Hop Albums (Billboard)	1

=== Monthly charts ===
Monthly chart performance
Chart (2025)	Position
Japanese Dance & Soul Albums (Oricon)	4

=== Year-end charts ===
Year-end chart performance
Chart (2024)	Position
Australian Hip Hop/R&B Albums (ARIA)	35
Belgian Albums (Ultratop Flanders)	140
Swiss Albums (Schweizer Hitparade)	56

Year-end chart performance
Chart (2025)	Position
Australian Albums (ARIA)	16
Austrian Albums (Ö3 Austria)	31
Belgian Albums (Ultratop Flanders)	22
Belgian Albums (Ultratop Wallonia)	69
Canadian Albums (Billboard)	10
Danish Albums (Hitlisten)	41
Dutch Albums (Album Top 100)	15
French Albums (SNEP)	61
German Albums (Offizielle Top 100)	28
Hungarian Albums (MAHASZ)	39
Icelandic Albums (Tónlistinn)	19
Italian Albums (FIMI)	91
New Zealand Albums (RMNZ)	11
Polish Albums (ZPAV)	60
Spanish Albums (PROMUSICAE)	99
Swedish Albums (Sverigetopplistan)	43
Swiss Albums (Schweizer Hitparade)	22
UK Albums (OCC)	57
US Billboard 200	4
US Top R&B/Hip-Hop Albums (Billboard)	2

== Certifications ==
Certifications
Region	Certification	Certified units/sales
Australia (ARIA)	Gold	35,000^{‡}
Belgium (BRMA)	Gold	10,000^{‡}
Brazil (Pro-Música Brasil)	Gold	20,000^{‡}
Denmark (IFPI Danmark)	Platinum	20,000^{‡}
France (SNEP)	Gold	50,000^{‡}
Germany (BVMI)	Gold	75,000^{‡}
Italy (FIMI)	Gold	25,000^{‡}
New Zealand (RMNZ)	2× Platinum	30,000^{‡}
Poland (ZPAV)	Gold	15,000^{‡}
Portugal (AFP)	Platinum	7,000^{‡}
United Kingdom (BPI)	Gold	100,000^{‡}
^{‡} Sales+streaming figures based on certification alone.
