= Dodger Blue (song) =

2024 song by Kendrick Lamar featuring Wallie the Sensei, Siete7x and Roddy Ricch

Song by Kendrick Lamar featuring Wallie the Sensei, Siete7x and Roddy Ricch

from the album GNX
- Released: November 22, 2024
- Genre: West Coast hip-hop; G-funk
- Length: 2:11
- Label: PGLang; Interscope
- Songwriters: Kendrick Duckworth; Samuel Dew; Traquan Tyson; Craig Johnson Jr.; Mark Spears; Jack Antonoff; Taji Ausar; Timothy Maxey; Terrace Martin
- Producers: Sounwave; Antonoff; Tane Runo; Tim Maxey; Martin (add.)

GNX track listing
- 12 tracks: 1. "Wacced Out Murals"; 2. "Squabble Up"; 3. "Luther"; 4. "Man at the Garden"; 5. "Hey Now"; 6. "Reincarnated"; 7. "TV Off"; 8. "Dodger Blue"; 9. "Peekaboo"; 10. "Heart Pt. 6"; 11. "GNX"; 12. "Gloria"

"Dodger Blue" (stylized in all lowercase) is a song by the American rapper Kendrick Lamar from his sixth studio album, GNX (2024). It features the American rappers Wallie the Sensei, Siete7x and Roddy Ricch and additional vocals from the American musician INK. The song was produced by Sounwave, Jack Antonoff, Tane Runo and Tim Maxey, with additional production from Terrace Martin.

== Composition ==
The song is primarily composed of G-funk elements; Drew Gillis of The A.V. Club described it "channels the sound of funk becoming new jack swing à la Guy or Mint Condition". Lyrically, the song explores the culture of Los Angeles. Performing in singsong vocals, Kendrick Lamar shouts out to local high schools and, most notably, directs criticism at people with a negative view of Los Angeles based on common misconceptions, as well as locals who pretend to hate the city. He also mentions the gang rivalry of the "Dreamers and the Jets".

== Critical reception ==
Michael Saponara of Billboard placed the song at number 12 (last place) in his ranking of the songs from GNX, writing "Kenny weaves through the distorted bounce with a hazy flow with some help from Ink, Siete and Roddy Ricch. The West Coast tribute fails to break through like some of the other stronger tracks on the LP so it's forced to blend in with the background." Alphonse Pierre of Pitchfork stated that "Kendrick reps L.A. hard on the mellow 'dodger blue,'" before commenting "But he wastes Wallie the Sensei and Roddy Ricch by having them harmonize on chillwave synths, a sin when you have access to basically every g-funk producer alive or dead."

== Charts ==
=== Weekly charts ===
Weekly chart performance for "Dodger Blue"
Chart (2024)	Peak position
Australia (ARIA)	37
Australia Hip Hop/R&B (ARIA)	10
Canada Hot 100 (Billboard)	29
Global 200 (Billboard)	15
Lithuania (AGATA)	34
New Zealand (Recorded Music NZ)	18
South Africa (Billboard)	15
Sweden Heatseeker (Sverigetopplistan)	1
US Billboard Hot 100	11
US Hot R&B/Hip-Hop Songs (Billboard)	8

=== Year-end charts ===
Year-end chart performance for "Dodger Blue"
Chart (2025)	Position
US Hot R&B/Hip-Hop Songs (Billboard)	43
