= Mr. Morale & the Big Steppers =

Studio album by Kendrick Lamar
- Released: May 13, 2022
- Recorded: 2019–2022
- Studios: Ameraycan (North Hollywood); Circle House (Miami); EastWest (Los Angeles); IGA (Santa Monica); Larrabee Sound (North Hollywood); LVRN (Atlanta); No Excuses (Santa Monica); No Name (Tarzana); Other Islands (Miami Beach); Stellar House (Los Angeles); Shangri-La (Malibu); United (Los Angeles); Windmark (Santa Monica)
- Genre: Conscious hip-hop
- Length: 73:06
- Labels: PGLang; TDE; Aftermath; Interscope
- Producers: The Alchemist; Baby Keem; Beach Noise; Bekon; Boi-1da; Cardo; Craig Balmoris; DJ Dahi; DJ Khalil; the Donuts; Duval Timothy; Frano; Grandmaster Vic; Jahaan Sweet; J. Lbs; Oklama; Pharrell Williams; Sounwave; Tae Beast

Kendrick Lamar chronology
Black Panther: The Album (2018)	Mr. Morale & the Big Steppers (2022)	GNX (2024)

Singles from Mr. Morale & the Big Steppers
- 1. "N95" Released: May 20, 2022; 2. "Silent Hill" Released: May 31, 2022; 3. "Die Hard" Released: August 9, 2022

Mr. Morale & the Big Steppers is the fifth studio album by the American rapper Kendrick Lamar, released on May 13, 2022, by PGLang, Top Dawg Entertainment (TDE), Aftermath Entertainment, and Interscope Records. The album serves as his first release under his creative company PGLang, and his final project with both TDE and Aftermath. Lamar, who executive produced the album under the pseudonym Oklama, reunited with frequent collaborators Sounwave, J. Lbs, DJ Dahi, and Bekon for the majority of the album's production.

Mr. Morale & the Big Steppers is a concept album that analyzes and reflects on his life experiences during his therapy journey. Its lyrics touch on a variety of personal themes, including childhood and generational trauma, infidelity, and celebrity worship. Primarily a conscious hip-hop record, the album experiments with minimalist production while incorporating elements of jazz, R&B, trap, and soul. It features narration by Whitney Alford and Eckhart Tolle, and guest appearances from Blxst, Amanda Reifer, Sampha, Taylour Paige, Summer Walker, Ghostface Killah, Baby Keem, Kodak Black, Sam Dew, Tanna Leone, and Beth Gibbons of Portishead.

Upon release, Mr. Morale & the Big Steppers was met with widespread acclaim from critics, who praised Lamar's lyricism and the album's scope, although some found it inconsistent and Kodak Black's appearance controversial. The album was supported by three singles: "N95", "Silent Hill", and "Die Hard", all of which charted within the top 10 on the US Billboard Hot 100. Other promotional initiatives included headlining performances at Glastonbury Festival and Rolling Loud, and a musical guest appearance on the season 48 premiere of Saturday Night Live. Mr. Morale & the Big Steppers debuted atop the Billboard 200, marking Lamar's fourth number-one album in the United States. The album won Best Rap Album at the 65th Annual Grammy Awards and received eight nominations, including Album of the Year. To further promote the album, Lamar embarked on his fourth solo headlining tour, titled the Big Steppers Tour, which visited Europe, North America and Oceania.

== Background ==
Following the release of his fourth studio album Damn (2017), Kendrick Lamar took a five-year musical hiatus. During this time, he executive produced the soundtrack album for the superhero film Black Panther (2018), became a father of two children with his longtime romantic partner Whitney Alford, and founded the creative services company PGLang with his creative partner Dave Free. Lamar cites a two-year stretch of writer's block as one of the reasons for his long absence.

In December 2020, the Roskilde Festival announced that Lamar would be headlining the festival's 50th anniversary event in 2021, noting that "new material [was] on the way". However, the festival was cancelled in May 2021 due to COVID-19 restrictions. In an August blog post, Lamar announced that he was in the process of producing his final album under Top Dawg Entertainment, writing:

I spend most of my days with fleeting thoughts. Writing. Listening. And collecting old Beach cruisers. The morning rides keep me on a hill of silence. I go months without a phone. Love, loss, and grief have disturbed my comfort zone, but the glimmers of God speak through my music and family. While the world around me evolves, I reflect on what matters the most. The life in which my words will land next. As I produce my final TDE album, I feel joy to have been a part of such a cultural imprint after 17 years. The Struggles. The Success. And most importantly, the Brotherhood. May the Most High continue to use Top Dawg as a vessel for candid creators. As I continue to pursue my life's calling. There's beauty in completion. And always faith in the unknown. Thank you for keeping me in your thoughts. I've prayed for you all. See you soon enough.

== Recording ==
Rap has truly helped my expansion of self. Beyond the perception of who I believed to be. [...] Music is air to a young nigga at this point. Mr. Morale, the catalyst of my self-expression.

— Kendrick Lamar on Mr. Morale & the Big Steppers

Lamar described Mr. Morale & the Big Steppers' songwriting as material he's written in the past that's "just now seeing daylight" due to his own personal insecurities. He and his longtime producer, Sounwave, began recording the album in early 2019 during a week-long brainstorming session in London; the only song from the session that made it onto the album was "Father Time". Both Lamar and Sounwave described making the album as "one of the toughest creative processes imaginable" due to Lamar's privacy, the COVID-19 pandemic, and the deaths of Nipsey Hussle and Kobe Bryant.

During recording sessions, Lamar shielded the album away from most of his family members because he didn't want their influence or feelings to override his own; had he told them about it, then "them shits would've never came out". Sounwave admitted that there were times during the album's creation where "I was almost ready to give up music. Not going to lie to you. I was that lost and that down 'cause there was nobody dropping music and nothing coming out to inspire you." In an attempt to "stay alive and keep my hope alive in music", he took on an A&R position for both Mr. Morale & the Big Steppers and Baby Keem's The Melodic Blue (2021).

Lamar credits becoming a father as what made him "question everything the most". When Mr. Morale & the Big Steppers was nearing completion in May 2021, he contemplated scrapping the project because of how personal it was. He ultimately released the album because of how beneficial it would be for his children in the future.

== Music and lyrical themes ==
The standard edition of Mr. Morale & the Big Steppers is a double album consisting of 18 songs split into two sections, titled Big Steppers and Mr. Morale, which each have nine tracks. The digital version found on streaming services also contains "The Heart Part 5", originally released as a stand-alone promotional single, appended to the end of the record as a bonus track. With a playing time of over 73 minutes, it is Lamar's second-longest recorded studio album behind To Pimp a Butterfly (2015) at just over 78 minutes.

=== Composition ===
Mr. Morale & the Big Steppers is a conscious hip-hop record primarily rooted in minimalist production. It also incorporates elements of free jazz, funk, psychedelic jazz, blues, quiet storm, R&B, soul, trap, and West Coast hip-hop. Much of the album was produced by Lamar's frequent collaborators Sounwave, J. Lbs, DJ Dahi, and Bekon. Other production contributions came from Boi-1da, Baby Keem, Jahaan Sweet, the Donuts, Tae Beast, The Alchemist, and Pharrell Williams, amongst others. Alford and spiritual teacher Eckhart Tolle are credited as narrators of several tracks. Songwriting contributions came from a variety of artists such as singer-songwriter Sam Dew, production team Beach Noise, and pianist Duval Timothy, in addition to Thundercat, Tommy Paxton-Beesley, and Homer Steinweiss.

=== Themes ===
Due to its "messy but honest" lyrical content, many critics have regarded Mr. Morale & the Big Steppers as Lamar's most confessional body of work. Its concept provides an independent analysis and reflection of his life experiences during his therapy journey. Throughout the album, Lamar revolves around personal themes regarding his childhood and generational trauma, sexual addiction and infidelity to Alford, and struggles with celebrity worship and fame. Other topics addressed on the album include fatherhood, daddy issues, therapeutic breakthroughs, spiritual consolation, gender identity, accountability, fake news, cancel culture, capitalism, and performative activism. Regarding the album's candid viewpoint, Dr. Christopher Driscoll, assistant professor of religion, Africana, and American studies at Lehigh University, writes "Within the intensely polarizing times we live today, very few artists across genres have the skill and the willingness to be so responsibly honest. Hip hop's always been better than many cultural spaces when it comes to unflinching honesty. [Lamar] runs with the latitude afforded by the hip hop culture he loves. The results are healing."

=== Songs ===
In "Auntie Diaries", Lamar recollects a story concerning his uncle and cousin, who are both transgender, while referencing issues regarding societal and religious views of gay and transgender individuals and those who associate with the LGBTQ+ community. The eighth track, "We Cry Together", samples Florence and the Machine's song "June". Lyrically, it revolves around a heated argument enacted by Lamar and actress Taylour Paige.

== Release and promotion ==
On April 18, 2022, Lamar revealed the album's title and release date through a PGLang-headed letter. Following the announcement, his website was updated with a page titled "The Heart", which contained 399 empty computer folders. Lamar confirmed the project would be a double album on May 3, by sharing a photo of the album's master copy. The album artwork was revealed on May 11. The cover, photographed by Renell Medrano, features Lamar wearing a crown of thorns and holding his and Alford's daughter while Alford cradles an infant in the background. Mr. Morale & the Big Steppers was released via digital download and streaming on May 13. The album was released on CD on May 27, and on vinyl and cassette tape on August 26.

=== Live performances ===
On June 23, 2022, Lamar performed four songs from Mr. Morale & the Big Steppers—"Savior", "Rich Spirit", "Count Me Out", and "N95"—at French fashion house Louis Vuitton's Men's Spring/Summer 2023 show, in honor of their late artistic director Virgil Abloh, during Paris Fashion Week. Hours after the performance, he headlined Milano Summer Festival. Lamar headlined Glastonbury Festival on June 26, becoming the first hip-hop artist to close out the festival. As a part of his concert tour, he headlined Rolling Loud on July 24. On October 1, 2022, Lamar served as the musical guest on the season 48 premiere of Saturday Night Live.

=== Singles ===
To help anticipate Mr. Morale & the Big Steppers' arrival, Lamar surprise released "The Heart Part 5" as a promotional single on May 8, 2022, with an accompanying music video. The fifth installment to his "The Heart" song series, it was met with widespread critical acclaim and peaked at number 15 on the US Billboard Hot 100. On May 14, Lamar released the music video for "N95". The song, which debuted at number three on the Hot 100, was sent to Italian contemporary hit radio on May 20, as the album's lead single. The second single "Silent Hill" was serviced to American rhythmic radio formats on May 31. "Die Hard" was sent to American rhythmic contemporary radio on August 9, as the album's third single.

=== Tour ===
On May 13, 2022, following and in promotion of the album's release, Lamar announced his fifth solo headlining tour, the Big Steppers Tour, which visited Europe, North America and Oceania. Baby Keem and Tanna Leone served as the opening acts for three of the tour's four legs. The October 22 performance at Accor Arena in Paris, France was livestreamed on Amazon Music's Twitch channel to commemorate the ten-year anniversary of the release of Lamar's second studio album Good Kid, M.A.A.D City (2012). A director's cut of the performance was released as a concert film, titled Kendrick Lamar Live: The Big Steppers Tour, exclusively to Amazon Prime Video on November 23.

== Critical reception ==
Mr. Morale & the Big Steppers ratings
Aggregate scores
Source	Rating
AnyDecentMusic?	8.7/10
Metacritic	85/100
Review scores
Source	Rating
AllMusic	4/5 stars
The Daily Telegraph	4/5 stars
Exclaim!	9/10
The Guardian	5/5 stars
NME	5/5 stars
Pitchfork	7.6/10
Rolling Stone	3.5/5 stars
Slant Magazine	4/5 stars
The Times	5/5 stars
Uncut	4/5 stars

Mr. Morale & the Big Steppers was met with widespread critical acclaim. At Metacritic, which assigns a normalized rating out of 100 to reviews from professional publications, the album received an average score of 85, based on 26 reviews, indicating "universal acclaim". Aggregator AnyDecentMusic? gave it 8.7 out of 10, based on their assessment of the critical consensus.

Ben Bryant of The Independent called the album a "tender opus from the defining poet of his generation", writing, "The rapper's first album in five years is a haunting and surprising meditation on fatherhood and family". In a five-star review for The Guardian, Alexis Petridis praised the themes, lyricism and style. Robin Murray from Clash enjoyed the album, saying, "Mr. Morale & the Big Steppers is one of his most profound, complex, revelatory statements yet, a double album fueled by sonic ambition, the will to communicate, and Kendrick's staunch refusal to walk the easy path". Steve Loftin of The Line of Best Fit said, "It being one so vulnerable and exposing (including using his family for the artwork), stripping the skin down to the bone, is bold, beautiful, but most importantly, a reminder that an artist like Kendrick Lamar is once in a generation". Reviewing the album for NME, Kyann-Sian Williams stated, "While Good Kid, M.A.A.D City showed the world what it's like to grow up as a kid in Compton, his fifth album serves up vignettes about what it's like to be a Black adult whose trauma still haunts them". Rob Moura of PopMatters said, "On Mr. Morale & the Big Steppers, renowned rapper Kendrick Lamar observes the strife plaguing his kingdom and consciously abdicates the throne". Writing for Exclaim!, Riley Wallace stated, "Kendrick Lamar lets it all out, and even if it's the last time we hear from him in this form, he's metaphorically put his whole heart on the table, with yet another body of work worthy of multiple spins and endless dissection". Fred Thomas from AllMusic also stated that "While not always an easy listen, the album shows more of its intention as it goes, and ultimately makes sense as the next logical step forward in Lamar's increasingly multi-dimensional artistic evolution".

In a four-star review for The Daily Telegraph, Will Pritchard praised the album's concept and the Kendrick's ability to take "big swings" on songs such as "Father Time" and "Worldwide Steppers". Pritchard lightly criticized the "occasional blip" on the album, citing the command to "stop tap dancing around the conversation" in "We Cry Together" as the album's most obvious misstep. In a positive review, Pitchfork's Stephen Kearse said, "On his fifth album, Kendrick retreats from the limelight and turns to himself, highlighting his insecurities and beliefs. It's ambitious, impressive, and a bit unwieldy". Rolling Stone critic Jeff Ihaza said, "The Pulitzer Prize-winning rapper spends much of his fifth studio album deconstructing his own mythology. The result is at moments brilliant but on the whole, frustratingly uneven". In a more mixed review, Miloslaw Archibald Rugallini of Sputnikmusic praised the album's writing and performance, but criticized the production and perceived lack of cohesion, stating that "the instrumentals rarely serve the performances they exist to enhance", and that "the listening experience is defined by languorous stretches between big moments, and becomes more of an exercise in patience than an engaging and enlivening journey". Jon Caramanica of The New York Times opined that "Mr. Morale is probably Lamar's least tonally consistent work", "rangy and structurally erratic, full of mid-song beat switches, sorrowful piano and a few moments of dead air".

Despite being met with widespread acclaim, Mr. Morale & the Big Steppers also received criticism. The inclusion of rapper Kodak Black on the album garnered controversy due to him having been accused of rape in 2016 and pleading guilty to first-degree assault and battery. While "Auntie Diaries" was met with praise from critics and some transgender listeners, the song was also met with criticism due to Lamar's repeated usage of "faggot", in addition to accusations of deadnaming and misgendering his trans relatives and media personality Caitlyn Jenner.

=== Rankings ===
Select rankings of Mr. Morale & the Big Steppers
Publication	List	Rank	Ref.
Billboard	The 50 Best Albums of 2022	4	
Complex	The Best Albums of 2022	1	
Exclaim!	Exclaim!'s 50 Best Albums of 2022	6	
The Guardian	The 50 Best Albums of 2022	2	
The Independent	The Best Albums of 2022	3	
NME	The 50 Best Albums of 2022	5	
Pitchfork	The 50 Best Albums of 2022	13	
Pitchfork	The 100 Best Albums of the 2020s So Far	28	
Rolling Stone	The 100 Best Albums of 2022	11	
Slant Magazine	The 50 Best Albums of 2022	7	
Time	The 10 Best Albums of 2022	8	

== Industry awards ==
Mr. Morale & the Big Steppers was the most nominated album by a male artist at the 65th Annual Grammy Awards, receiving eight including Album of the Year, Best Rap Album, Song of the Year and Record of the Year. Lamar became the first artist in any genre to be nominated for Album of the Year with four consecutive lead studio albums since Billy Joel (1979–1983).

Awards and nominations for Mr. Morale & the Big Steppers
Year	Ceremony	Category	Result	Ref.
2022	American Music Awards	Favorite Hip Hop Album	Won	
2022	BET Hip Hop Awards	Album of the Year	Won	
2022	People's Choice Awards	The Album of 2022	Nominated	
2023	BET Awards	Album of the Year	Nominated	
2023	Grammy Awards	Album of the Year	Nominated	
2023	Grammy Awards	Best Rap Album	Won	
2023	NAACP Image Awards	Outstanding Album	Nominated	

== Commercial performance ==
Upon release, Mr. Morale & the Big Steppers received the largest first day streams of 2022 on Apple Music, garnering over 60 million streams. In the United States, the album debuted at number one on the Billboard 200 chart dating May 28, 2022, opening with 295,000 album-equivalent units that consisted of 35,000 album sales and 258,000 streaming units (calculated from the 343.02 million on-demand streams the album's tracks received). Mr. Morale & the Big Steppers became Lamar's fourth number-one album in the country, and was the largest opening week for an album in 2022 at the time. The album became the first hip-hop album of 2022 to reach one billion streams on Spotify. As of November 30, 2022, Mr. Morale & the Big Steppers was the thirteenth best-selling album of the year according to Hits. Still, according to the magazine, the album has moved a total of 1,063,000 album-equivalent units by the end of 2022, including 177,000 pure album sales, 52,000 song sales, 1.127 billion audio-on-demand streams, and 66.091 million video-on-demand streams.

== Track listing ==
Disc 1: Big Steppers
No.	Title	Writer(s)	Producer(s)	Length
1.	"United in Grief"	Kendrick Duckworth; Sam Dew; Mark Spears; Jason Pounds; Duval Timothy; Matt Schaeffer; Johnny Kosich; Jake Kosich; Timothy Maxey	Oklama; Sounwave; J. Lbs; Timothy; Beach Noise^{[a]}; Tim Maxey^{[a]}	4:15
2.	"N95"	Duckworth; Dew; Matthew Samuels; Spears; Jahaan Sweet; Hykeem Carter	Boi-1da; Sounwave; Sweet; Baby Keem^{[a]}	3:15
3.	"Worldwide Steppers"	Duckworth; Dew; Spears; Donte Perkins; Pounds; Vincent Crane; Pat Darnell; Phillip Hunt	Sounwave; Tae Beast; J. Lbs^{[a]}	3:23
4.	"Die Hard" (with Blxst and Amanda Reifer)	Duckworth; Matthew Burdette; Amanda Reifer; Dew; Stephen Bruner; Victor Ekpo; Spears; Dacoury Natche; Carter; Pounds; Michael Mulé; Isaac De Boni; Marvin Eugene Smith; Robert T. "Bob" Smith	Sounwave; DJ Dahi; Baby Keem; J. Lbs; FnZ^{[c]}	3:59
5.	"Father Time" (featuring Sampha)	Duckworth; Sampha Sisay; Spears; Natche; Schaeffer; Johnny Kosich; Jake Kosich; Daniel Tannenbaum; Timothy; Ekpo; Kennis Jones	Sounwave; DJ Dahi; Beach Noise; Bekon; Timothy; Grandmaster Vic^{[b]}	3:42
6.	"Rich" (interlude)	Bill Kapri; Dew; Timothy	Timothy	1:43
7.	"Rich Spirit"	Duckworth; Dew; Spears; Natche; Frano Huett; A. Thomas; D. Dennis; G. Jackson; M. Hall	Sounwave; DJ Dahi; Frano	3:22
8.	"We Cry Together" (with Taylour Paige)	Duckworth; Alan Maman; Pounds; Tannenbaum; Florence Welch; Gary Peacock	The Alchemist; J. Lbs^{[c]}; Bekon^{[a]}	5:41
9.	"Purple Hearts" (with Summer Walker and Ghostface Killah)	Duckworth; Summer Walker; Dennis Coles; Dew; Anthony Dixson; Spears; Khalil Abdul-Rahman; Pounds; Schaffer; Johnny Kosich; Jake Kosich	Sounwave; DJ Khalil; J. Lbs^{[a]}; Beach Noise^{[a]}	5:29
Total length:				34:49

Disc 2: Mr. Morale
No.	Title	Writer(s)	Producer(s)	Length
10.	"Count Me Out"	Duckworth; Dew; Spears; Natche; Pounds	Oklama; Sounwave; DJ Dahi; J. Lbs; Maxey^{[a]}	4:43
11.	"Crown"	Duckworth; Dew; Timothy	Timothy	4:24
12.	"Silent Hill" (with Kodak Black)	Duckworth; Kapri; Samuels; Spears; Sweet; Schaeffer; Johnny Kosich; Jake Kosich	Boi-1da; Sounwave; Sweet; Beach Noise^{[a]}	3:40
13.	"Savior" (interlude)	Duckworth; Carter; Spears; Pounds	Oklama; Sounwave; J. Lbs	2:32
14.	"Savior" (with Baby Keem and Sam Dew)	Duckworth; Dew; Tannenbaum; Spears; Ronald LaTour; Pounds; Mario Luciano; Tobias Breuer; Tommy Paxton-Beesley	Cardo; J. Lbs; Sounwave; Oklama; Luciano^{[c]}; Rascal^{[c]}	3:44
15.	"Auntie Diaries"	Duckworth; Homer Steinweiss; Daniel Krieger; Tannenbaum; Tyler Mehlenbacher; Sergiu Gherman; Craig Balmoris; Schaeffer; Johnny Kosich; Jake Kosich	Bekon; Mehlenbacher; Gherman; Balmoris; Beach Noise^{[a]}	4:41
16.	"Mr. Morale" (with Tanna Leone)	Duckworth; Avante Santana; Dew; Pharrell Williams	Williams	3:30
17.	"Mother I Sober" (featuring Beth Gibbons)	Duckworth; Beth Gibbons; Dew; Bruner; Spears; Tannenbaum; Pounds; Maxey	Sounwave; Bekon; J. Lbs	6:46
18.	"Mirror"	Duckworth; Krieger; Stuart Johnson; Spears; Natche; Tannenbaum; Mehlenbacher; Gherman; Balmoris	Sounwave; DJ Dahi; Bekon; Mehlenbacher; Gherman; Balmoris; Maxey^{[a]}	4:16
Total length:				38:16

Digital bonus track
No.	Title	Writer(s)	Producer(s)	Length
19.	"The Heart Part 5"	Duckworth; Johnny Kosich; Schaeffer; Jake Kosich; Leon Ware; Arthur Ross	Beach Noise	5:32

=== Notes ===
- ^{^[c]} signifies a co-producer
- ^{^[a]} signifies an additional producer

=== Sample credits ===
- "United in Grief", "Count Me Out", and "Mother I Sober" interpolates "Paradise", written by John Scherer and Tim Maxey, as performed by Not the Twos.
- "Worldwide Steppers" contains samples of "Break Through", written by Vincent Crane and Pat Darnell, as performed by The Funkees; contains samples of "Look Up Look Down", written by Phillip Hunt, as performed by Soft Touch; and contains an uncredited excerpt from the clip "When There is No Cheese at the Cookout", spoken by Radel Ortiz.
- "Die Hard" contains samples and interpolations of "Remember the Rain", written by Marvin Eugene Smith, as performed by Kadhja Bonet, and "Shimmy, Shimmy, Ko-Ko-Bop", written by Robert T. Smith, as performed by Little Anthony and the Imperials.
- "Father Time" contains samples of "You're Not There", written by Kennis Jones, as performed by Hoskins 'NCrowd.
- "We Cry Together" contains a sample of "June", written by Florence Welch, as performed by Florence and the Machine; and contains samples of "Valentine", written by Gary Peacock, as performed by Gary Peacock, Art Lande, and Eliot Zigmund.
- "Crown" contains samples of "Through the Night", as performed by Duval Timothy.
- "Savior" contains samples of "Hypnotized", written by Tommy Paxton-Beesley, as performed by River Tiber.
- "Mr. Morale" contains an uncredited excerpt from the clip "Dallas Cowboys look pathetic vs the Seahawks", spoken by Josh Shango, courtesy of The Dallas Cowboy Show.
- "The Heart Part 5" interpolates "I Want You", written by Leon Ware and Arthur Ross, as performed by Marvin Gaye.

== Personnel ==
Credits adapted from liner notes.

=== Musicians ===
- Amanda Reifer – vocals (4)
- Anneston Pisayavong – choir (10)
- Baby Keem – drums (4), vocals (13, 14)
- Bekon – bass (5, 18), keyboards (5, 15, 18), strings (15, 18), background vocals (15, 18), percussion (18)
- Beth Gibbons – featured vocals (17)
- Blxst – vocals (4)
- Brenton Calvin Lockett – choir (10)
- Bryce Xavier – choir (10)
- Daniel Krieger – guitar (15, 18)
- Danny McKinnon – guitar (10), bass (10)
- Denise Stoudmire – choir arranger (10)
- DJ Dahi – programming (5, 7, 18), bass (7), percussion (7), drums (10, 18), background vocals (10)
- Duval Timothy – piano (1, 5, 6, 11)
- Eckhart Tolle – narration (10, 13, 16)
- Florence Welch – sampled vocals (8)
- Frano – keyboards (7), programming (7)
- Ghostface Killah – vocals (9)
- Grandmaster Vic – strings (4, 17)
- Homer Steinweiss – drums (15)
- Kendrick Lamar – vocals (1–5, 7–12, 14–18)
- Kodak Black – narration (3, 18), vocals (6, 12)
- Immryr LoBasso Spencer – choir (10)
- Jaheen King Tombs – choir (10)
- J. Lbs – bass (10)
- Mike Larsen – programming (16)
- Paris Burton – choir (10)
- Sam Dew – background vocals (7), vocals (14)
- Sampha – featured vocals (5), background vocals (6)
- Sounwave – drums (5, 7, 18), programming (18)
- Stuart Johnson – percussion (18)
- Summer Walker – vocals (9)
- Sydney Bourne – choir (10)
- Tanna Leone – vocals (16)
- Taylour Paige – vocals (8)
- Thundercat – bass (4, 17)
- Whitney Alford – narration (1, 5, 8)

=== Technical ===
- Ray Charles Brown Jr. – engineer (1, 3–9, 11–15, 17)
- Jonathan Turner – engineer (1, 3–7, 9, 11–13, 15, 17–18)
- Matt Schaeffer (Beach Noise) – engineer (1–5, 8–9, 12, 15, 17–18)
- Johnny Kosich (Beach Noise) – engineer (1, 4–5, 15)
- James Hunt – engineer (5, 14, 15)
- Derek Garcia – engineer (6, 8, 12)
- Raymond J. Scavo III – engineer (9)
- Andrew Boyd – engineer (14), assistant engineer (1–12, 15–17)
- Chad Gordon – engineer (15)
- Matt Anthony – engineer (15, 18)
- Sedrick Moore II – assistant engineer (1, 2, 5)
- Wesley Seidman – assistant engineer (4, 12, 18)
- Brandon Wood – assistant engineer (5, 8)
- Kaushlesh "Gary" Purohit – assistant engineer (5)
- Rob Bisel – assistant engineer (5)
- Tristan Bott – assistant engineer (5, 8)
- Erwing Olivares – assistant engineer (6)
- Logan Haynes – assistant engineer (8)
- Evan Fulcher – assistant engineer (9)
- Johnny Morgan – assistant engineer (11, 18)
- Hannah Kacmarsky – assistant engineer (15)
- Thomas Warren – assistant engineer (15)
- Zach Acosta – assistant engineer (15)
- Manny Marroquin – mixer (1–7, 9–18)
- Cyrus "Nois" Taghipour – mixer (8)
- Derek "MixedByAli" Ali – mixer (8)
- Anthony Vilchis – assistant mixer (1–7, 9–18)
- Trey Station – assistant mixer (1–7, 9–18)
- Zach Pereyra – assistant mixer (1–7, 9–18)
- Brandon Blatz – assistant mixer (8)
- Curtis "Sircut" Bye – assistant mixer (8)
- Emerson Mancini – mastering

=== Miscellaneous ===
- Kendrick Lamar – executive production (as Oklama), creative direction
- Dr. Dre – executive production
- Dave Free – creative direction
- Renell Medrano – album photography
- Chris Burnett – album design and layout

== Charts ==
=== Weekly charts ===
Weekly chart performance
Chart (2022)	Peak position
Australian Albums (ARIA)	1
Austrian Albums (Ö3 Austria)	2
Belgian Albums (Ultratop Flanders)	1
Belgian Albums (Ultratop Wallonia)	2
Canadian Albums (Billboard)	1
Czech Albums (ČNS IFPI)	4
Danish Albums (Hitlisten)	1
Dutch Albums (Album Top 100)	1
Finnish Albums (Suomen virallinen lista)	1
French Albums (SNEP)	3
German Albums (Offizielle Top 100)	3
Irish Albums (Official Charts)	1
Italian Albums (FIMI)	6
Japanese Albums (Oricon)	65
Japanese Hot Albums (Billboard Japan)	21
Lithuanian Albums (AGATA)	1
New Zealand Albums (RMNZ)	1
Norwegian Albums (VG-lista)	1
Polish Albums (ZPAV)	11
Portuguese Albums (AFP)	3
Scottish Albums (Official Charts)	4
Slovak Albums (ČNS IFPI)	1
Spanish Albums (Promusicae)	7
Swedish Albums (Sverigetopplistan)	1
Swiss Albums (Schweizer Hitparade)	2
UK Albums (Official Charts)	2
UK R&B Albums (Official Charts)	1
US Billboard 200	1
US Top R&B/Hip-Hop Albums (Billboard)	1

=== Year-end charts ===
Year-end chart performance
Chart (2022)	Position
Australian Albums (ARIA)	30
Austrian Albums (Ö3 Austria)	63
Belgian Albums (Ultratop Flanders)	28
Belgian Albums (Ultratop Wallonia)	87
Canadian Albums (Billboard)	27
Danish Albums (Hitlisten)	36
Dutch Albums (Album Top 100)	25
French Albums (SNEP)	118
German Albums (Offizielle Top 100)	75
Icelandic Albums (Tónlistinn)	41
Lithuanian Albums (AGATA)	29
New Zealand Albums (RMNZ)	23
Portuguese Albums (AFP)	81
Swiss Albums (Schweizer Hitparade)	22
UK Albums (OCC)	36
US Billboard 200	17
US Top R&B/Hip-Hop Albums (Billboard)	8

Year-end chart performance
Chart (2023)	Position
Belgian Albums (Ultratop Flanders)	111
US Billboard 200	88
US Top R&B/Hip-Hop Albums (Billboard)	46

Year-end chart performance
Chart (2024)	Position
Australian Hip Hop/R&B Albums (ARIA)	40
Belgian Albums (Ultratop Flanders)	133
US Top R&B/Hip-Hop Albums (Billboard)	100

Year-end chart performance
Chart (2025)	Position
Belgian Albums (Ultratop Flanders)	175

== Certifications ==
Certifications
Region	Certification	Certified units/sales
Australia (ARIA)	Gold	35,000^{‡}
Austria (IFPI Austria)	Gold	7,500^{‡}
Brazil (Pro-Música Brasil)	Platinum	40,000^{‡}
Denmark (IFPI Danmark)	Platinum	20,000^{‡}
France (SNEP)	Gold	50,000^{‡}
Italy (FIMI)	Gold	25,000^{‡}
New Zealand (RMNZ)	Platinum	15,000^{‡}
Poland (ZPAV)	Platinum	20,000^{‡}
United Kingdom (BPI)	Gold	100,000^{‡}
^{‡} Sales+streaming figures based on certification alone.

== Release history ==
Release dates and formats
Region	Date	Label(s)	Format(s)	Ref.
Various	May 13, 2022	PGLang; TDE; Aftermath; Interscope	Digital download; streaming	
Various	May 27, 2022	PGLang; TDE; Aftermath; Interscope	CD	
Japan	July 20, 2022	Universal Music Japan	CD	
Various	August 26, 2022	PGLang; TDE; Aftermath; Interscope	LP; cassette	

== See also ==
- 2022 in hip-hop
- List of number-one albums of 2022 (Australia)
- List of number-one albums of 2022 (Canada)
- List of number-one albums from the 2020s (New Zealand)
- List of UK R&B Albums Chart number ones of 2022
- List of Billboard 200 number-one albums of 2022
