= Silent Hill (song) =

2022 single by Kendrick Lamar and Kodak Black

Single by Kendrick Lamar and Kodak Black

from the album Mr. Morale & the Big Steppers
- Released: May 31, 2022
- Recorded: 2020–2022
- Genre: Trap
- Length: 3:40
- Label: PGLang; TDE; Aftermath; Interscope
- Songwriters: Kendrick Duckworth; Bill Kapri; Matthew Samuels; Mark Spears; Jahaan Sweet; Matthew Schaeffer; Johnny Kosich; Jake Kosich
- Producers: Boi-1da; Sounwave; Sweet

Kendrick Lamar singles chronology
"N95" (2022)	"Silent Hill" (2022)	"Die Hard" (2022)

Kodak Black singles chronology
"Slidin'" (2022)	"Silent Hill" (2022)	"Up n Stuck" (2022)

"Silent Hill" is a song by American rappers Kendrick Lamar and Kodak Black. It was sent to rhythmic contemporary radio and urban contemporary radio through PGLang, Top Dawg Entertainment, Aftermath Entertainment, and Interscope Records as the first US single (second overall) from Lamar's fifth studio album, Mr. Morale & the Big Steppers, on May 31, 2022. The song was produced by Boi-1da, Sounwave, and Jahaan Sweet, with additional production by Beach Noise.

== Composition ==
"Silent Hill" contains "crisp, lighter beats". In the chorus, Lamar states that he is "pushing the snakes, I'm pushing the fakes, I'm pushing them all off me like, 'Huh!'".

== Critical reception ==
NME music critic Kyann-Sian Williams felt that Lamar was inspired by the "loose rap style" of his cousin, fellow American rapper and record producer Baby Keem on "Silent Hill", which is highlighted by the "animated Kendrick voice we all love" in the chorus. Matthew Trammell of Pitchfork was reminded of DaBaby and Marilyn Manson's guest appearances on Kanye West's song, "Jail pt. 2", from the latter's tenth studio album, Donda (2021), due to Kodak's involvement in the song, explaining that "it's unclear whether his presence is meant to make a case for redemption or musical kinship". Writing for Rolling Stone, Jeff Ihaza conversely remarked that "in the hands of just about any other rapper, the song would read as nothing more than post Playboi Carti-era pastiche, but Kendrick finds new terrain, retracing over unexplored horizons" and "he tries out about three different cadences before Kodak Black, a perfect guest feature on the beat, arrives to deliver a case study on melodic rap".

== Credits and personnel ==
- Kendrick Lamar – vocals, songwriting
- Kodak Black – vocals, songwriting
- Boi-1da – production, songwriting
- Sounwave – production, songwriting
- Jahaan Sweet – production, songwriting
- Beach Noise
  - Matt Schaeffer – additional production, songwriting, engineering
  - Johnny Kosich – additional production, songwriting
  - Jake Kosich – additional production, songwriting
- Manny Marroquin – mixing
- Emerson Mancini – mastering
- Derek Garcia – engineering
- Johnathan Turner – engineering
- Ray Charles Brown, Jr. – engineering
- Andrew Boyd – recording assistance
- Wesley Seidman – recording assistance

== Charts ==
=== Weekly charts ===
Weekly chart performance for "Silent Hill"
Chart (2022)	Peak position
Australia (ARIA)	21
Canada Hot 100 (Billboard)	14
France (SNEP)	80
Global 200 (Billboard)	15
Lithuania (AGATA)	39
Portugal (AFP)	40
Slovakia (Singles Digitál Top 100)	68
South Africa Streaming (TOSAC)	11
Sweden Heatseeker (Sverigetopplistan)	2
UK Streaming (OCC)	38
US Billboard Hot 100	7
US Hot R&B/Hip-Hop Songs (Billboard)	5
US Rhythmic Airplay (Billboard)	7

=== Year-end charts ===
2022 year-end chart performance for "Silent Hill"
Chart (2022)	Position
US Hot R&B/Hip-Hop Songs (Billboard)	51
US Rhythmic (Billboard)	49

== Certifications ==
Certifications for "Silent Hill"
Region	Certification	Certified units/sales
Australia (ARIA)	Gold	35,000^{‡}
^{‡} Sales+streaming figures based on certification alone.

== Release history ==
Release history for "Silent Hill"
Region	Date	Format	Label	Ref.
United States	May 31, 2022	Rhythmic contemporary radio	PGLang; TDE; Aftermath; Interscope	
