= Art Rock Circus =

American band

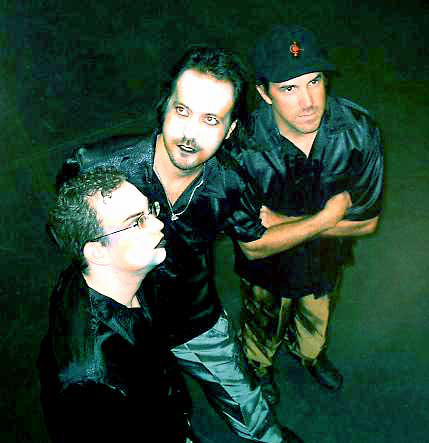

Background information
- Origin: Las Vegas
- Genres: Rock Opera; Hard rock Progressive rock Folk rock
- Years active: 1995–Present

Art Rock Circus is an American progressive rock band.

== Background ==
Art Rock Circus was founded in Las Vegas in 1995 first commissioned to perform the Rock Opera Heavens Cafe for Las Vegas-based Tributary Productions. Promoter Mike Lewis then financed and founded Tributary Records with John Miner for the purpose of creating an independent record label to support the growing resurgence of contemporary progressive rock in the 1990s.

Miner's previous work with art rock band Mantra Sunrise provided John Miner with left over material that was instrumental in the development of Heavens Cafe as a theatrical piece. The new band was formed with musicians from the Las Vegas area who were capable of executing the complexities of the material that included many odd time signatures and melodic counterpoint.

Heavens Cafe was first staged at the Flamingo Theater in Las Vegas in July 1996 with an all original cast of talent that was heavily auditioned from the extensive performing community of musicians dancers and actors. Some of the performers were auditioned from the Las Vegas Academy of Performing Arts.

The success of the theatrical stage production promoted a second run at the Charleston Performing Arts Center in 1998 then later in 2003 at the Insurgo Theater of the Arts in Los Angeles. The Art Rock Circus band performed at both of those venues with the addition of bassist Ken Jaquess and violinist Yvette Devereaux. A recording of the Las Vegas performance was released through the Tributary Music Label to the progressive rock community with strong critical acclaim and band leader John Miner was featured in issue 43 of Progression Magazine to discuss the success of Art Rock Circus and the music of Heavens Cafe.

Art Rock Circus released a follow-up album A Passage to Clear in 2001 which was also conceptual in nature. The album was again well received to the progressive rock and art rock communities, but not as well received as Heavens Cafe Live. A Passage to Clear was a story album that followed the difficulties of a female independent artist navigating the corruption of the professional art world of agents and gallery owners.

In 2005, Art Rock Circus released a double album Tell a Vision which became the band's most critically acclaimed work worldwide. The band featured musicians from both Heavens Cafe Live and A Passage to Clear sessions. The album was centered conceptually around the problematic issues of the digital age, particularly social media platforms, targeted conglomerate media corporations and the numbing effect of digital hand held devices.

In late 2005, Miner took time away from Art Rock Circus to work with K2 project with musicians Allan Holdsworth, Ken Jaquess, Ryo Okumoto and Yvette Devereaux. 2013 saw the release of Variations on a Dream which was the band's first instrumental album. The album featured keyboardist Milo Keysington who brought a more symphonic feel to the record.

== Discography ==
- 1996 Heavens Cafe' (John Miner)
- 1998 Heavens Cafe' Live
- 2001 A Passage To Clear
- 2005 Tell A Vision
- 2013 Variations on a Dream
