= Auntie Diaries =

Song by Kendrick Lamar

from the album Mr. Morale & the Big Steppers
- Released: May 13, 2022
- Recorded: May 2019
- Genre: Conscious hip-hop
- Length: 4:41
- Label: PGLang; Topdawg; Aftermath; Interscope
- Songwriters: Kendrick Duckworth; Daniel Tannenbaum; Daniel Krieger; Homer Steinweiss; Craig Balmoris; Matt Schaeffer; Jake Kosich; Johnny Kosich; Tyler Mehlenbacher; Sergiu Gherman
- Producers: Beach Noise; Craig Balmoris; Bekon; Sergiu Gherman; Tyler Reese

"Auntie Diaries" is a song by American rapper Kendrick Lamar from his sixth studio album Mr. Morale & the Big Steppers (2022). The fifteenth track on Mr. Morale & the Big Steppers and the sixth track on the album's second half, "Auntie Diaries" was produced by an ensemble of producers, including Beach Noise, Bekon, the Donuts, Craig Balmoris, and Tyler Mehlenbacher.

"Auntie Diaries" covers themes of transphobia. In the song, Lamar directly addresses his perspective on the gender transition of his uncle and cousin. Although praised by many transgender activists and personalities, Lamar's use of the slur faggot and direct approach towards the subject received critique and incited controversy. Lamar at the end of the song leaves listeners with a question to ponder about his use of the slur by telling the story of a previous performance in which he brought out a white female fan to perform his song with him but disapproved of her usage of the word nigga as part of the song, speaking in third person and critiquing himself as a hypocrite.

In the United States, "Auntie Diaries" reached number 47 on the Billboard Hot 100 and number 21 on the Hot R&B/Hip-Hop Songs chart.

== Background ==
On April 18, 2022, Kendrick Lamar announced a new album, titled Mr. Morale & The Big Steppers, his fifth studio album following the release of Damn (2017). The announcement was made through his website, oklama.com, launched in August 2021.

== Composition and lyrics ==
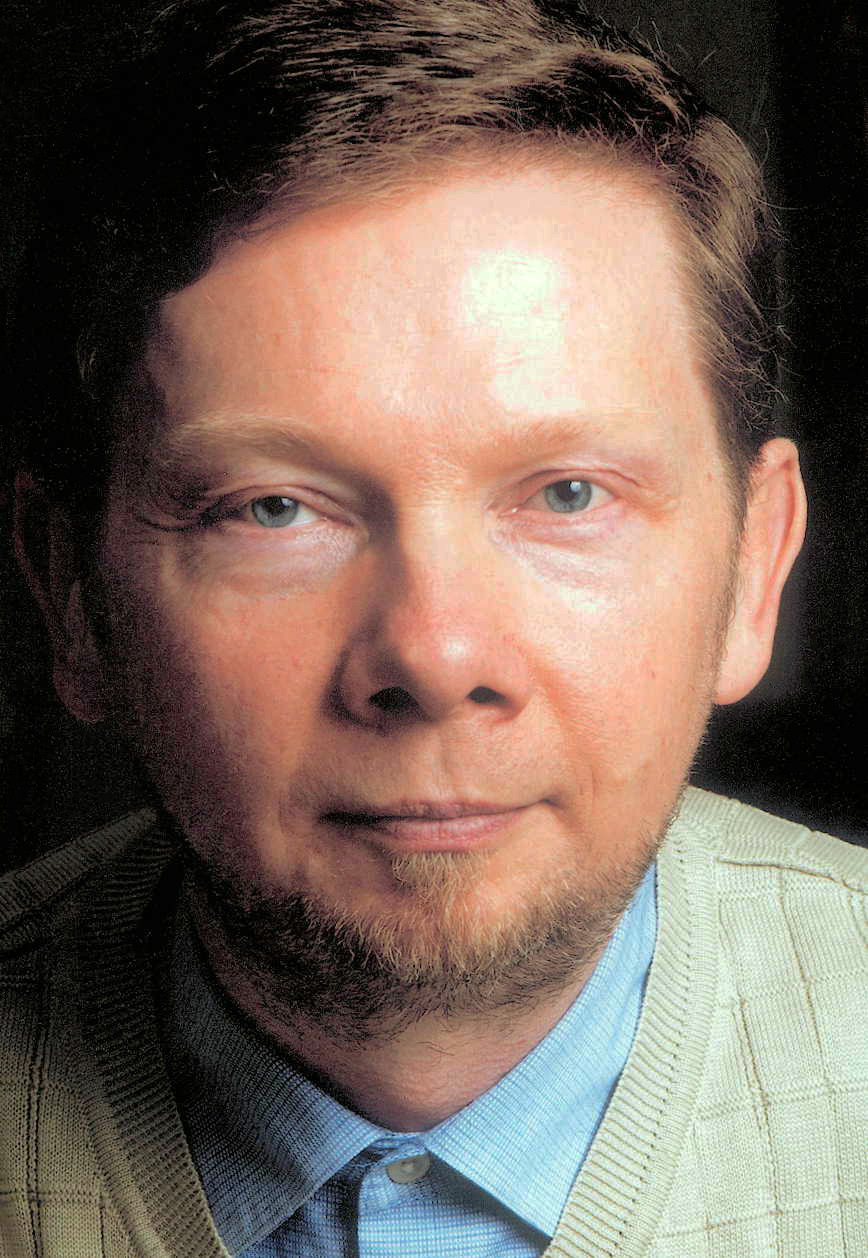
German spiritual teacher Eckhart Tolle is sampled in the beginning of the song.

Narration from German spiritual teacher Eckhart Tolle is sampled at the beginning of the song, followed by Lamar's verses.

The song is a reflection upon Lamar's acceptance of gender transitions within his family; the first verse of the song begins, "My auntie is a man now". Lamar's uncle and cousin are both transgender. "Auntie Diaries" continues the confessional motif of Mr. Morale & the Big Steppers. In the song, from the perspective of his younger self, Lamar repeatedly uses the word faggot, misgenders his relative's pronouns, and deadnames his family and Olympic gold medalist Caitlyn Jenner. The song culminates in Lamar as an adult confronting a minister, questioning the loving thy neighbor in regards to Christianity and homosexuality, stating, "The laws of the land or the heart, what's greater?"

== Critical reception ==
The song was met with mixed reviews from critics. Variety reviewed the song positively, noting, "While the song itself commits some language missteps, such as deadnaming and misgendering, it can be argued that the self-reflection, growth and learning shown through Lamar's lyrics are a positive step for a leader in the hip hop community." Vox said the subject matter "should have been handled with more care. True allyship requires nuance, and with more actionable methods, his intentions would be clearer-cut. Perhaps a feature from a queer rapper who could directly speak to the experience of receiving such hate from family would've helped the case here." Similarly, writing for Pitchfork, Stephen Kearse was critical of the song, saying: "In trying to impart a lesson about how [Lamar] learned then unlearned to say the f-slur, he makes himself the main character in his queer relatives' stories and he uses the slur wantonly...Kendrick has never been a perfect character actor, but in the past he at least imbued roles with some mark of individuality. Compared to Jay-Z's 'Smile,' which manages to tell the story of Hov's mom coming out of the closet and mixes flexes and intimacy, 'Auntie Diaries' lacks depth."

== Credits and personnel ==
Personnel

- Kendrick Lamar – songwriter, production
- Daniel Tannenbaum – production
- Homer Steinweiss – production
- Craig Balmoris – production
- Daniel Krieger – production
- Beach Noise – production
- Jake Kosich – production
- Johnny Kosich – production, engineer
- Matt Schaeffer – production, engineer
- Sergiu Gherman – production
- Tyler Mehlenbacher – production

Information taken from the Mr. Morale & the Big Steppers liner notes and Tidal.

== Charts ==
Chart performance for "Auntie Diaries"
Chart (2022)	Peak position
Australia (ARIA)	48
Canada Hot 100 (Billboard)	39
France (SNEP)	180
Global 200 (Billboard)	50
Lithuania (AGATA)	75
South Africa Streaming (TOSAC)	19
UK Streaming (OCC)	64
US Billboard Hot 100	47
US Hot R&B/Hip-Hop Songs (Billboard)	21
