= Wallie the Sensei =

American rapper (born 1997)

- Born: Traquan Tyson; December 20, 1997 (age 28); Compton, California, U.S.
- Genre: West Coast hip-hop
- Occupations: Rapper; songwriter; singer
- Instrument: Vocals
- Years active: 2019-present
- Labels: Cactus Jack; Capitol

Traquan Tyson (born December 20, 1997), known professionally as Wallie the Sensei, is an American rapper, singer, and songwriter born in Compton, California. He is perhaps best known for his association with fellow American rappers Kendrick Lamar and Travis Scott, the latter of whom signed him to his record label Cactus Jack Records in 2025.

== Career ==
Tyson began his recording career in 2019. He initially rose to mainstream prominence after releasing his breakout hit "03 Flow" on May 21, 2021. The song gained significant traction online, eventually amassing over 17 million total Spotify streams as of June 2026, however it failed to chart anywhere. In March 2024, he made his debut at the 2024 Rolling Loud in Inglewood, California. Later that year, he was featured on fellow Compton rapper Kendrick Lamar's song "Dodger Blue" from his sixth studio album GNX. The song peaked at number 11 on the US Billboard Hot 100, marking both his Billboard Hot 100 and worldwide chart debuts. In early 2025, he signed to Travis Scott's record label Cactus Jack Records. and was later featured on their second compilation album JackBoys 2.

== Musical style ==
Tyson has cited fellow Compton rapper Kendrick Lamar and R&B singer-songwriters Avant, Chris Brown, R. Kelly, Sisqó, and Dru Hill as influences.

== Discography ==
Studio albums

- GOLDEN CHILD (2021)
- HERE 2 STAY (2022)

EPs

- No Love (2020)

Mixtapes

- MADD DOGG: The Mixtape, Vol. 1 (2026)
