= When I Hear Music =

- 7" cover

Single by Debbie Deb
- Released: 1984
- Recorded: early 1984
- Studio: M.S.I. Studios
- Genre: Freestyle; electro
- Length: 7:10; 3:40 (edit)
- Label: Jam Packed
- Composer: "Pretty" Tony Butler
- Lyricist: Debbie Deb
- Producer: Butler

"When I Hear Music" is a freestyle song produced by "Pretty" Tony Butler and sung by Debbie Deb.

== Production ==
=== Background ===
"Pretty" Tony Butler learned music by studying electronics, fixing stereos and televisions and DJing. Butler recalled in 1985 that his parents "kept me enrolled in electronics classes and didn't let me out of the house when the guys wanted to go out. I was a nerd." He was in high school when he started DJing, playing music at a large skating rink called the Superstar Rollerteque with music by Planet Patrol, Kraftwerk and Soulsonic Force. Butler explained that Atlantic Records had been sending him records to test with audiences before they were officially released and Butler was able to predict which ones would become hits with great accuracy. Through these connections, he was asked by the label to make a hit record and set up his own studio similar to a DJ booth. Among the early tracks Butler made with this setup that included a Roland TR-808 and Roland Juno-60, were "Fix It in the Mix" and "Jam the Box". By then he had purchased a Prophet-5 emulator.

Butler met Debbie Wesoff Lopez (later known as Debbie Deb) when he was promoting concerts and heard her voice at a record store called Peaches Records. Lopez grew up and worked in North Miami and struggled in school. She was put in a work program in her senior year of high school, which got her a job at Peaches Records where she focused on the R&B and Rap sections of the store. He approached her asking if she would like to work on the record, despite Lopez stating she did not sing and was not certain about making a record.

=== Production ===
Butler gave Lopez the address to his studio in Liberty City where she arrived that night. Lopez described the recording studio as having "a lot of drug money put into [it]. It was in a warehouse with no windows or anything and only one door to get in and there were security cameras outside." Butler played her the backing for "When I Hear Music" and two days later she went back to studio to record it. Butler described Lopez's vocals, noting that about "75% of her vocals were off" but that "tone is what people like." Butler recorded her vocals on a two-track tape machine which had a variable speed knob, and turned the pitch of her vocals up when she was flat.

== Music ==
In the Spin Alternative Record Guide, the song was described as taking the bassline from "Planet Rock" by Afrika Bambaataa & the Soul Sonic Force and added simple video game sounding effects while adding a "toylike melody" from sound effects from chimes. Vocals were described as having a "fragile anticipation" with "When I hear music, it makes me dance / You Got the music...here's my chance!" Florida International University's DJ Mamey Disco commented that Butler's style was not typical of freestyle duets, "more like booty electro [...] Pretty Tony was more about beats. He had a black freestyle sound mixed with Latin tropical flavor."

== Release ==
At the time of release "Fix It in the Mix" and "Jam the Box" were still in the charts which led to Butler realizing that he "was cutting records too fast to actually make money because I didn’t understand how it went. My records were actually competing against each other. But then they taught me at the radio station that only a certain amount of records from a label can be played at one time. I go, “I got four records.” A lightbulb went off in my head, and I go, "Wait, I need more labels." Every record I did was on a different label, so now all of them could be played on the radio at one time." Butler continued that "I really didn’t make a bunch of money. I didn’t know what I was doing. I’m not embarrassed to say it. You can have a hit record and it will put you out of business chasing it." and "You’ve got to figure the whole thing out. The guys in the radio station taught me a lot about the radio side. But I had nobody teach me about the publishing, writing, marketing, licensing and all that stuff. I own all my masters and publishing. I knew enough to do that."

Lopez stated she was not looking into becoming a singer, feeling uncomfortable with her weight and had low self-esteem. Lopez was unaware the song was even released until she was driving home at about late at night and heard "When I Hear Music" on the radio, which led her to pull her car over as she "couldn't believe it was actually on the radio. It was an insane feeling." Lopez stated she felt a bit of injustice as she had just started beauty school and found the song became a big hit with Lopez finding that "Thousands of dollars are coming in to somebody, but not to me. I didn't know; I was young and inexperienced. I was given an artist-for-hire piece of paper and $75 to sing it." Lopez performed the song a few times but felt they were "disasters" as she "didn't know what [she] was doing." A blonde woman named Anne would then perform as Debbie Deb under her name who would perform later on the track "I'm Searching" which despite being labeled a Pretty Tony record, Butler had no involvement in the track. Lopez spoke about her involvement with Butler in 2010, stating Butler "knows what he did to me; he took advantage of me being a minor [...] He didn't do it to hurt me, he was just making business decisions that benefited him. But he is a genius. I do owe him some credit for finding me and exposing me. Without him, I wouldn't be here talking to you. Was it worth getting ripped off? Yes."

== Track listing ==
12" single (JPI-101)

1. "When I Hear Music" – 7:10
2. "When I Hear Music (Inst.)" – 7:30

== Charts ==
Chart (1984)	Peak position
Black Singles	43

== Sampling ==
Rap artist Pitbull uses a sample of the song on his 2006 song, "Fuego."

Rap artist Kendrick Lamar sampled the song on his 2024 song "Squabble Up" from his sixth album GNX. Deb praised Lamar's usage of the sample in a tweet on X.

In 2009, Lady Tigra from the hip hop duo L'Trimm performed the song on the Nickelodeon children's show Yo Gabba Gabba.
