= Mother I Sober =

Song by Kendrick Lamar

from the album Mr. Morale & the Big Steppers
- Released: May 13, 2022
- Genre: Conscious hip hop, alternative R&B
- Label: pgLang, Top Dawg Entertainment, Aftermath Entertainment, Interscope Records
- Songwriters: Kendrick Lamar, Sounwave, J.LBS, Thundercat, Beth Gibbons, Sam Dew
- Producers: Sounwave, Bēkon, J.LBS

"Mother I Sober" is a song by American rapper Kendrick Lamar. Released on May 13, 2022 as the 17th track on his fifth studio album Mr. Morale & the Big Steppers, the song features notable vocalists such as Beth Gibbons, the lead vocalist of the British trip-hop group Portishead, and Sam Dew, as well as additional vocals from Lamar's fiancée Whitney Alford. The track was produced by Sounwave, Bēkon, and J.LBS. The song is widely regarded by critics as one of the many high points of the album and its emotional and thematic centerpiece.

== Background ==
Mr. Morale & the Big Steppers was Kendrick Lamar's final album released under the partnership with Dr. Dre's Aftermath Entertainment, Top Dawg Entertainment, and Interscope Records before creating his own label pgLang. Lamar has described the record as a work of deep personal excavation while simultaneously confronting trauma and the ability to heal. "Mother I Sober" represents the album's most direct and vulnerable moment, with Lamar addressing a magnitude of issues such as generational trauma, sexual abuse, sex addiction, and grief.

In an interview with Lamar's frequent collaborator SZA published in Harper's Bazaar, Lamar revealed that he wept while writing and recording the song, describing it as one of the most emotionally demanding endeavors he ever undertook. At the 65th Grammy Awards in 2023, where Mr. Morale & the Big Steppers won Best Rap Album, Lamar singled out the track in his acceptance speech, saying: "I would like to thank the culture for allowing me to evolve in order to make a song like 'Mother I Sober.' That's special to me."

== Composition ==
=== Musical ===
The track is built around a sparse piano melody, with a subtle bass line that critics have noted mirrors a slow heartbeat, reinforcing the song's intimate and confessional tone. Unlike most tracks on the album, "Mother I Sober" largely abandons conventional rap delivery and cadences in favor of a personal, soft-spoken, and restrained delivery, lending it the quality of a confession. The production gradually builds in intensity as the piano grows louder — as producer Sounwave has described, "The piano is a character too." The production culminates in an explosive final section in which Lamar's vocals rise from a whisper to a passionate cry, with the piano correspondingly going silent before returning to its original volume, signaling catharsis.

== Lyrical content and meaning ==
"Mother I Sober" is organized around three confessional verses, each addressing a distinct and deeper layer of trauma, together building a portrait of inherited pain passed silently between generations.

=== Verse 1 ===
The first verse opens with Lamar as a five-year-old child witnessing his mother being physically abused by his cousin "Chaotic." He describes his feelings of powerlessness, being too young to intervene, and a guilt that persisted into adulthood — establishing one of the song's central themes: that the failure to protect a loved one, even when entirely beyond one's control, can become a wound that festers for decades.

Lamar also introduces the theme of sobriety referenced in the song's title. In this context, sobriety is not merely the avoidance of substances but the decision to remain emotionally present to pain rather than numbing it — in Lamar's case, through sex addiction as referenced on the album's opening track, "United in Grief." The theme suggests that facing trauma without an emotional buffer is the only way to break through the cycle of generational trauma.

=== Verse 2 ===
The second verse recounts how Lamar's family incorrectly believed that a cousin had sexually abused him. Despite his persistent denials, he was not believed. Years later, his mother revealed she had been projecting her own unresolved fear onto him, not out of malice but out of a misguided desire to protect him. This section details the mechanisms of intergenerational trauma with unusual precision: his mother's unresolved abuse led her to perceive a threat that did not exist, and her inability to believe her son's denials caused him lasting psychological harm.

This verse also establishes how the false accusations pressured Lamar to assert and perform his masculinity as a defense mechanism, setting in motion patterns of behavior that would damage his relationship with his fiancée Whitney Alford and his journey to break that generational cycle before it affects his children.

=== Verse 3 ===
In the third verse, Lamar confesses to a sex addiction developed as a coping mechanism for his trauma, which led him to be unfaithful to his long-term partner Whitney Alford, with whom he has two children. This section is notable for its refusal to offer self-justification; Lamar does not attribute his actions to his trauma as an excuse but instead frames them as a consequence he takes full responsibility for.

He then draws a connection between his personal behavior and a broader history, suggesting that hypersexuality in the Black American community carries the traces of sexual violence inflicted during slavery — historical trauma passed down through behavior rather than conscious memory.

=== Final section ===
The song's final section represents the climax of the album. Lamar's delivery shifts to raw and urgent as he names the collective weight of the trauma explored throughout: sexual violence against Black women, cycles of silence, and the cost of unacknowledged grief. Whitney Alford and Sam Dew join the track, representing real relationships that are worth fighting and healing for.

== Critical reception ==
"Mother I Sober" received widespread critical acclaim and is frequently cited as one of the best and most significant songs on Mr. Morale & the Big Steppers, with praise focused on its emotional honesty, ambition, and thematic depth.

The Ringer's long-form musical analysis podcast Dissect dedicated two episodes to dissecting the song and its meaning. Critics and reviewers highlighted the contrast between the song's restrained tone across its first three verses and the emotional eruption of its final section as evidence of masterful craft.

== Charts ==
Chart (2022)	Peak position
US Billboard Hot 100	59

== Personnel ==
- Kendrick Lamar — lead vocals, songwriter
- Beth Gibbons — featured vocals, songwriter
- Whitney Alford — additional vocals
- Sam Dew — additional vocals, songwriter
- Sounwave — producer, songwriter
- Bēkon — producer
- J.LBS — producer, songwriter
- Thundercat — songwriter
- Ray Charles Brown Jr. — engineering
