= N95 (song) =

2022 single by Kendrick Lamar

Single by Kendrick Lamar

from the album Mr. Morale & the Big Steppers
- Released: May 20, 2022
- Recorded: 2019–2022
- Genre: Conscious hip-hop; trap
- Length: 3:15
- Label: PGLang; Top Dawg; Aftermath; Interscope
- Songwriter: Kendrick Duckworth
- Producers: Boi-1da; Jahaan Sweet; Sounwave

Kendrick Lamar singles chronology
"Family Ties" (2021)	"N95" (2022)	"Silent Hill" (2022)

Music video
- "N95" on YouTube

"N95" is a song by American rapper Kendrick Lamar. It was released as the lead single from his fifth studio album, Mr. Morale & the Big Steppers, on May 20, 2022, through PGLang, Top Dawg Entertainment, Aftermath Entertainment, and Interscope Records. The song was produced by Boi-1da, Sounwave, and Jahaan Sweet, with additional production by Lamar's cousin, fellow American rapper and record producer Baby Keem.

== Composition and lyrics ==
"N95", its name deriving from the defining mask of COVID-19 pandemic has been described as "a seething cultural critique where Lamar spits bile in multiple directions over a bleakly catchy, bass-driven instrumental". Lyrically, Lamar raps about masks that go with expensive clothing rather than the N95 respirator mask that was used during the outbreak of COVID-19, as he raps: "Take all that designer bullshit off and what do you have? Bitch, ugh. You ugly as fuck." During the bridge, Lamar uses a verse that was originally intended for the song "Vent" from his cousin Baby Keem's album The Melodic Blue (2021), yet did not make the cut.

== Critical reception ==
The song received generally positive reviews from critics. Chase McMullen of Beats Per Minute drew a comparison between "N95" and "the blistering raps of" Lamar's fourth studio album, Damn (2017). The Guardian music critic Alexis Petridis noted that "the tone of his delivery changes so dramatically and so often that it sounds less like the work of one man than a series of guest appearances". NME music critic Kyann-Sian Williams saw the song as "the most high-octane track" from Mr. Morale & the Big Steppers, which includes "a plethora of zippy one-liners and humour, which you might not expect sandwiched between piercing commentary on materialism and society".

== Music video ==
Lamar was seen filming a music video in September 2020, which would later be confirmed as scenes of "N95" (said scenes were Lamar floating above the ocean and using a phone booth). The official music video for "N95", directed by Lamar himself and Dave Free, was released on May 14, 2022. Similar to his music video for "Element", the video features heavy imagery in the form of a wide range of scenes. At the beginning of the video, a sign reads "This Shit Hard" in big red capital letters and appears a few more times throughout the video. Scenes include Lamar in a Jesus-like crucified pose floating over ocean waves, Lamar doing workouts on the roof of a dilapidated apartment, Lamar running from a horde of black men (which serves as a reference to Childish Gambino's music video for "This Is America"), an example of the 20th century doll experiments, Lamar and Baby Keem walking through a hallway (the latter suddenly kissing the former on the cheek, causing both of them to stop in their tracks), Lamar using a phone booth, and more.

== Credits and personnel ==
- Kendrick Lamar – vocals, songwriting
- Boi-1da – production, songwriting
- Sounwave – production, songwriting
- Jahaan Sweet – production, songwriting
- Baby Keem – additional production, songwriting
- Emerson Mancini (Note: Mancini, who publicly came out as a trans man in January 2023, is credited by his deadname, Michelle Mancini.) – mastering
- Manny Marroquin – mixing
- Anthony Vilchis – mixing assistance
- Trey Station – mixing assistance
- Zach Pereyra – mixing assistance
- Andrew Boyd – recording assistance
- Sedrick Moore II – recording assistance
- Joe Visciano – engineering
- Matt Schaeffer – engineering
- Sam Dew – additional vocals

== Charts ==
=== Weekly charts ===
Weekly chart performance for "N95"
Chart (2022)	Peak position
Australia (ARIA)	3
Austria (Ö3 Austria Top 40)	21
Canada Hot 100 (Billboard)	2
Croatia (Billboard)	16
Czech Republic Singles Digital (ČNS IFPI)	42
Denmark (Tracklisten)	12
France (SNEP)	24
Global 200 (Billboard)	2
Hungary (Stream Top 40)	30
Iceland (Tónlistinn)	10
Ireland (IRMA)	4
Lithuania (AGATA)	12
Netherlands (Single Top 100)	26
New Zealand (Recorded Music NZ)	2
Nigeria (TurnTable Top 50)	20
Norway (VG-lista)	21
Portugal (AFP)	6
Singapore (RIAS)	20
Slovakia (Singles Digitál Top 100)	13
South Africa Streaming (TOSAC)	1
Sweden (Sverigetopplistan)	22
Switzerland (Schweizer Hitparade)	6
UK Singles (OCC)	6
UK Hip Hop/R&B (OCC)	2
US Billboard Hot 100	3
US Hot R&B/Hip-Hop Songs (Billboard)	2

=== Year-end charts ===
2022 year-end chart performance for "N95"
Chart (2022)	Position
US Hot R&B/Hip-Hop Songs (Billboard)	55

== Certifications ==
Certifications for "N95"
Region	Certification	Certified units/sales
Australia (ARIA)	2× Platinum	140,000^{‡}
Brazil (Pro-Música Brasil)	Gold	20,000^{‡}
France (SNEP)	Gold	100,000^{‡}
Poland (ZPAV)	Gold	25,000^{‡}
United Kingdom (BPI)	Silver	200,000^{‡}
^{‡} Sales+streaming figures based on certification alone.

== Release history ==
Release history for "N95"
Region	Date	Format	Label	Ref.
Italy	May 20, 2022	Contemporary hit radio	Universal	
