= Debbie Deb =

American singer (born 1966)

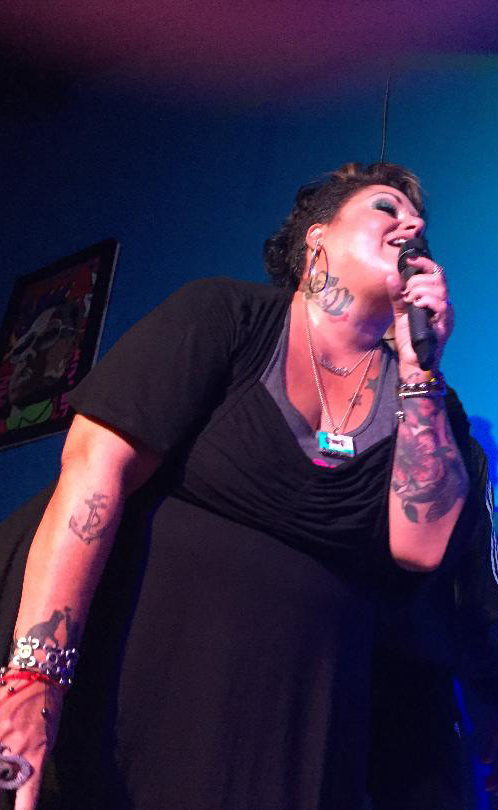
- Deb in 2017

Background information
- Born: Deborah Claire Wesoff-Kowalski; March 10, 1966 (age 60)
- Origin: New York City, U.S.
- Genres: Dance; freestyle; pop
- Instruments: Vocals
- Years active: 1984–present
- Labels: Pandisc Records; Jam Packed; Hot Productions
- Website: debbiedebmusic.com

Deborah Claire Wesoff-Kowalski (born March 10, 1966), known professionally as Debbie Deb, is an American singer and songwriter best known for her 1980s freestyle dance singles "Lookout Weekend" and "When I Hear Music".

== Early life ==
Debbie Deb was born in Brooklyn, New York City, and raised in North Miami Beach, Florida. At the age of 16, producer Pretty Tony identified her talent at a Miami record store, where she was working. While Deb had no formal training, she had been singing most of her life.

== Career ==
Pretty Tony told Deb that he liked the way she spoke and asked if she could sing, to which she answered "yes". They recorded "When I Hear Music", which she co-wrote with Pretty Tony in his studio the very next day. Released on the Jam Packed record label in 1984, the song has since become a staple in clubs and on dance and urban radio stations and mixshows. Other hits followed, including "Lookout Weekend", "I Wanna Work It Out", "There's a Party Going On", "I Wanna Dance" and a remake of Connie's 1980s Latin freestyle classic "Funky Little Beat".

An album titled Lookout Weekend appeared on the market under Debbie Deb's name. It included "When I Hear Music", "Lookout Weekend", "I'm Searchin'" and "Fantasy". "I'm Searchin'" went on to become a club and radio hit, but features another vocalist on the lead recording that song and "Fantasy" as "Debbie Deb". The cover of the CD featured a drawing of "Debbie Deb", however, Deb was overweight and suffered from low self-esteem, and found her sudden fame difficult to cope with. She was crushed when her record company decided not to put her picture on the sleeves of her records and, in a Milli Vanilli-esque move, even hired an "impostor" to perform and pose as "Debbie Deb". As a result, she made little, if any, money from her hit singles, and was so hurt by the experience that she stopped singing for years, relying on her work as a hairdresser to make ends meet.

Deb finally resurfaced on the recording scene in 1995 with the album She's Back.

Now living in New Port Richey, Florida, Deb continues to stay busy performing frequent concerts around the United States, especially "freestyle revival" shows with other artists like Lisa Lisa, Stevie B, Exposé, The Cover Girls, and Shannon. Gwen Stefani and Jonathan Davis of Korn have cited Deb as an influence, and in the summer of 2006, Janet Jackson featured a cover version of "Lookout Weekend" on her website.

In 2009, Debbie debuted a new single, "Everytime You Come Around," on her Myspace page, where she bills herself as "The Real Debbie Deb".

In 2014, EDM DJ Jauz did a remix of "When I Hear Music" which turned out to be a huge success for him. The two even performed the song together at the Philadelphia Fillmore in 2015.

In 2015, Debbie rerecorded a new version of "Lookout Weekend" with electro-house artist Reid Stefan. Deb recorded the new vocals at the Philadelphia studio of famed musician, arranger, composer and record producer, Bobby Eli.

== Discography ==
=== Albums ===
Year	Album details
1995	She's Back: Released: November 21, 1995; Label: Pandisc Records
1997	Lookout Weekend: Released: July 22, 1997; Label: Jam Packed, Hot Productions

=== Singles ===
Year	Single	Chart positions		Album
Year	Single	US Dance Sales	US R&B	Album
1984	"When I Hear Music"	–	43	Non-album singles
1984	"Lookout Weekend"	26	–	Non-album singles
1987	"I'm Searchin'"	8	72	Non-album singles
1987	"Fantasy"	–	–	Non-album singles
1988	"Wild Thing (Holds Me Tight)"	–	–	Non-album singles
1989	"There's a Party Goin 'On"	–	–	She's Back
1996	"Funky Little Beat"	–	–	She's Back
1997	"Lookout Weekend / When I Hear Music"	–	–	Lookout Weekend
2009	"Everytime You Come Around"	–	–	Non-album singles
2015	"Lookout Weekend" (with Reid Stefan)	–	–	Non-album singles

== Sampling ==
The song "When I Hear Music" has been sampled by many artists, such as Pitbull ("Fuego" from his 2006 album El Mariel), BabyTron ("Frankenstein" from his 2021 album BIN Reaper 2), Xscape ("What's Up"), Lil Jon feat. Shauna K & Freezy ("Dance"), Lathun ("Freak It"), Big Delph ("VIP" notable for its frequent plays on BET: Uncut), Voltio feat. Jowell & Randy ("Ponmela" from his 2007 album En lo Claro), Real McCoy ("Run Away" from their 1995 album Another Night), Kendrick Lamar ("Squabble Up" from his 2024 album GNX), and Melissa Lujan who also covered the song. The beat was also used in the Sharyn Maceren track "Reverse" from the album The One, released in late 2018.

== Cover versions ==
- Kid Sister recorded a hip-hop cover version of "Lookout Weekend" featuring Nina Sky for the soundtrack of the MTV reality show Jersey Shore.
- Janet Jackson released a cover version of "Lookout Weekend", retitled as "Weekend", as a free digital download on her website as a gift to her fans prior to the release of her 2006 album 20 Y.O. Her cover of the song was also featured in a making-of documentary for 20 Y.O. that appeared on a bonus DVD included with the album.
- Daron Malakian from System of a Down has sung a part of "Lookout Weekend" live as the intro to "Sugar".
- The Black Eyed Peas covered "Lookout Weekend" with Esthero for their 2000 album Bridging the Gap, simply titled "Weekends"
- Kelis sampled the same melody from "Lookout Weekend" & "When I Hear Music" in her 2006 Album Kelis Was Here on the track "Weekend".
- Buzz Fuzz used the melody from "When I Hear Music" on the track "King of the Beats", combined with a sample from "Get Busy" by Disco Four.
- Dan Bryk recorded a medley of "Lookout Weekend" and Graham Parker's "The Weekend's Too Short" on his 2003 covers album If I Were You.
- Randy Ramirez recorded a hard rock version of "When I Hear Music" that is featured on his Myspace.
- Jason Mraz has sung a part of "Lookout Weekend" in the middle of one of his songs live.
- Lady Tigra of L'Trimm covered "When I Hear Music" in the episode "Band" of the children's television show Yo Gabba Gabba!, which first aired on October 15, 2009.
- In 2014 EDM DJ Jauz did a remix of "When I Hear Music" which turned out to be a huge success for him. The two even performed the song together at the Fillmore in Philadelphia in 2015.

== In popular culture ==
- "Lookout Weekend" is featured in the 2019 film Ma.
- "When I Hear Music" is featured in Call of Duty: Infinite Warfare on the map Zombies in Spaceland.
