= John Miner (musician) =

American rock and jazz guitarist

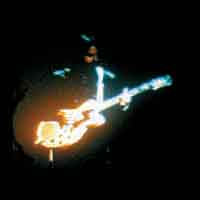
- Onstage with Art Rock Circus circa 1996 Heavens Cafe Live in Las Vegas

Background information
- Origin: Las Vegas
- Genres: Rock Opera; Hard rock Progressive rock Folk rock
- Years active: 1992–Present

John Miner is an American rock and jazz guitarist.

== Biography ==
Composer John Miner may be best known for his rock opera Heavens Cafe, which was staged at the Flamingo Theater in Las Vegas 1996, the Charleston Performing Arts Center in 1997, and later at Insurgo Theater in Los Angeles in 2004. Miner formed the progressive rock group Art Rock Circus to perform the music with a live band on stage alongside the singers and actors. Investor Mike Lewis was instrumental in financing and staging Heavens Cafe. The Tributary Music Label released a live CD of Heavens Cafe to the progressive rock community in 2000.

Previously, Miner co-founded the California-based art rock band Mantra Sunrise in 1992 with singer-bassist Joel Bissing and drummer Wayne Garabedian. The band produced the self-titled album "Mantra Sunrise" in 1994.

In 2001 "A Passage to Clear" was released by Miner's Art Rock Circus, also being conceptual in nature. The album featured two female vocalists, Karyn Anderson, and Karen Marquart. The album was not as well received as Heavens Cafe'.

Collaborating with drummer and composer Nolan Stolz, Miner rebuilt the Art Rock Circus from the ground up, and in 2005 released a double CD Tell a Vision. The extensive keyboard palate in addition to Miner's eclectic guitar stylings found an accepting progressive rock audience.

In 2005, Miner wrote and constructed guitar parts for the K² (band) album Book of the Dead that would integrate around the lead parts of Allan Holdsworth.

Musically, Miner is known for his use of several alternate guitar tunings, and this is evident in nearly all his compositions. The use of a double necked guitar has enabled the performer to switch from one tuning to another within the same song in a live situation.

His use of odd time signatures is apparent in the majority of his work as a composer, particularly in Heavens Cafe, in which the majority of the album features unorthodox metering. Other distinct characteristics of the composer include the absence of repeating choruses. Drum and bass parts are usually hinting toward melody, rather than standard rock fare. As a producer, Miner's analog recording techniques have been the discussion of much debate in the modern digital world.

=== Projects ===
- Mantra Sunrise
- Heavens Cafe
- Art Rock Circus
- K² (band)

=== Live Performance (Only) Projects ===
- Art Rock Ensemble (2012–2014)
- Bindi's Wild Adventure (2015–2019)
- Blue Cinema (2020-Current)

== Discography ==
From official website:

=== Albums ===
- [2013] Variations on a Dream/ Art Rock Circus
- [2005] Tell A Vision/ Art Rock Circus
- [2005] Book of the Dead/ K2
- [2001] A Passage To Clear/ Art Rock Circus
- [1998] Heavens Cafe' Live/ Art Rock Circus
- [1996] Heavens Cafe'/ John Miner
- [1995] Lost My Way/ Mantra Sunset
- [1994] Mantra Sunrise/ Mantra Sunrise
