= Oli Jacobs =

British music recording and mixing engineer

Oli Jacobs is a British recording and mixing engineer living in Los Angeles. He is an 12x nominated, 5x Grammy Award winner, known for his work with artists such as Taylor Swift, Kendrick Lamar, Troye Sivan, Baby Keem, Doja Cat, Harry Styles, and Peter Gabriel, and for his frequent collaborations with producer Jack Antonoff.

== Education ==
Jacobs studied on the Tonmeister music and sound recording course at the University of Surrey.

== Career ==
After graduating, Jacobs began his career as an in-house engineer at Peter Gabriel's Real World Studios. During this period, he worked on several top-10 albums, including Harry Styles's Harry's House and The 1975's Being Funny in a Foreign Language.

Jacobs has become a frequent collaborator of American producer Jack Antonoff, engineering on records for artists including Taylor Swift (The Tortured Poets Department), Sabrina Carpenter (Short n' Sweet, Man's Best Friend), and Bleachers.

He has mixed several tracks for Kendrick Lamar, including the Billboard Hot 100 number-one album GNX, with number-one singles "Luther" and "Squabble Up". In the UK, he has engineered on number-one albums such as This Is How Tomorrow Moves by Beabadoobee and i/o by Peter Gabriel.

== Awards and nominations ==
Jacobs has received multiple awards for his engineering work, including the Grammy Award for Best Engineered Album, Non-Classical twice. He has 12 Grammy nominations with 5 wins to date.

In 2023, he won Recording Engineer of the Year at the Music Producers Guild Awards.

Year	Organization	Award	Work	Result	Ref.
2023	65th Annual Grammy Awards	Album of the Year	Harry's House (as engineer)	Won	
2023	65th Annual Grammy Awards	Best Engineered Album, Non-Classical	Harry's House (as engineer)	Won	
2023	Music Producers Guild Awards	Recording Engineer of the Year	N/A	Won	
2025	67th Annual Grammy Awards	Album of the Year	Short n' Sweet (as engineer)	Nominated	
2025	67th Annual Grammy Awards	Album of the Year	The Tortured Poets Department (as engineer)	Nominated	
2025	67th Annual Grammy Awards	Record of the Year	"Fortnight" (as engineer)	Nominated	
2025	67th Annual Grammy Awards	Best Engineered Album, Non-Classical	i/o	Won	
2025	67th Annual Grammy Awards	Best Engineered Album, Non-Classical	Short n' Sweet	Nominated	
2025	Music Producers Guild Awards	Mix Engineer of the Year	N/A	Nominated	
2026	68th Annual Grammy Awards	Album of the Year	GNX (as engineer and mixer)	Nominated	
2026	68th Annual Grammy Awards	Album of the Year	Man's Best Friend (as engineer)	Nominated	
2026	68th Annual Grammy Awards	Record of the Year	"Luther" (as engineer and mixer)	Won	
2026	68th Annual Grammy Awards	Record of the Year	"Manchild" (as engineer)	Nominated	
2026	68th Annual Grammy Awards	Best Rap Album	GNX (as engineer and mixer)	Won	
2027	69th Annual Grammy Awards	Album of the Year	Lost Weekend (as engineer)	Pending	
