= Mantra Sunrise =

- Self Titled 1994

Background information
- Origin: California
- Genres: Progressive rock Hard rock Psychedelic rock Folk rock
- Years active: 1992–Present

Mantra Sunrise is an American Progressive Rock group.

== Information ==
Mantra Sunrise was a progressive rock band that performed and recorded in the early 1990s. The band's power trio format featured vocalist and bass guitarist Joel Bissing, guitarist John Miner, and Wayne Garabedian, who doubled on drums and keyboards.

Their self-titled debut album was recorded during 1992 and 1993 in a converted farmhouse in the San Joaquin Valley of California. Seven years later the album was released on the Las Vegas-based Tributary Music Label in 2000. The twenty-minute epic "Land of Sprinagar" became a favorite of late night progressive rock radio shows.

== Albums ==
- "Mantra Sunrise" self-titled release Tributary Label 2000

== Track list ==
- Why
- Time of Year
- Brudenell
- Dying Day
- Sleeping Whales
- Northern Light
- Your Heart (acoustic)
- Your Heart
- Casino
- Land of Sprinagar
- Mantra Sunset

== History ==
Miner and Garabedian had worked together in several local bands before deciding to get more serious and explore the possibility of recording material Miner had written during his recent world travels. Miner's compositions were based for the most part on alternate tunings and the use of odd time signatures, a direction Miner would continue to explore further in years to come, particularly in his work with Art Rock Circus. Garabedian found Bissing in a coffee shop in Fresno, California and arranged an audition with Miner upon his return to California. Bissing gave the music a unique voice, a stylistic approach on bass guitar, and also made significant contributions as a songwriter on their album.

The group expanded their live shows by featuring special guests performing on violin and flute. The band also incorporated elements of modern dance and eastern belly dancing at their shows. Visual elements were aided by stage smoke, slide shows and other psychedelic special lighting effects. Mantra's sophisticated staging did find its critics within the grunge movement that favored a more stripped down, no nonsense approach to live music in the early 1990s.

== Unfinished recordings ==
The band had plans to record a follow-up concept album with some tracks recorded in Seattle by Bissing and Miner, but the band was not able to finish the recording due to management and logistical problems. Another aborted attempt to revive the project with Art Rock Circus drummer Nolan Stolz fell through in 2002 in Las Vegas where Miner was working on his rock opera Heavens Cafe. The future of the follow-up album is still in question to this day.

== Discussions and critical analysis ==
- The Hairless Heart Herald- United Kingdom
- Progressive World- Belgium
- Progressor-Russia
- DURP- Netherlands
- Prog-Nose- Netherlands
- DME Rock Reviews- Israel
- Metacreative Radio
- Nucleus- Argentina
- Progressive-Newsletter- Germany
- Jesters News- Germany
- Arlequins- Italy
- Music in Belgium Reviews
- Rock Net USA

== Interviews ==
- Progression Magazine with John Miner Issue No. 46 2004
- American Freedom Interview with John Miner 7/13/ 2004
