= She's Back (Debbie Deb album) =

Studio album by Debbie Deb
- Released: 1995
- Recorded: 1995
- Genre: Pop, freestyle, dance
- Label: Pandisc
- Producer: Ivan Kopas, Robert Bartko, Amos Larkin II, Inez Stone, Calvin and Carlton Mills

Debbie Deb chronology
Lookout Weekend (1986)	She's Back (1995)

She's Back is the first full-length recorded album by freestyle music artist Debbie Deb, released on November 21, 1995.

== Track listing ==
1. "(There's A) Party Goin' On" (Old Skool Mix) 3:33
2. "When I Hear Music" 7:03
3. "If It's Not One Thing...It's Another" 4:18
4. "I Wanna Dance" 3:57
5. "Funky Little Beat" 4:53
6. "What About This Heart?" 4:57
7. "Lookout Weekend" 6:04
8. "I Wanna Work It Out" 2:42
9. "Someday" 4:09
10. "Now That You're Gone" 3:48
11. "All Night Long " 2:44
12. "(There's A) Party Goin' On" (Moretta's Club Mix) 6:34
