= Marvin Eugene Smith =

American songwriter

Marvin Eugene Smith (born 1952) is an American songwriter, executive and producer. He is a former protege of Motown producer Norman Jesse Whitfield. He has been active in the music industry for 40 years.

His songs have been recorded by a diverse range of artists that include Jerry Butler ("The Devil in Mrs. Jones" Motown 1977) to Rose Royce ("You're A Winner" Whitfield-Warner 1980, "Somehow We Made It Through the Rain" Epic 1981) to Trey Songz ("Gotta Go" Capital 2004) to Charlie Wilson ("There Goes My Baby" BMG 2009) to Mario, Chris Brown and Nicki Minaj ("Somebody Else" RCA 2013).
