= Yvette Devereaux =

American violinist and conductor

Yvette Devereaux is an American violinist, conductor and Director at the South Pasadena Music Center and Conservatory in Pasadena, California. She was the first African-American woman to attain a conductor's degree from the Peabody Conservatory of Music. She was honored by the city of Los Angeles in February 2007 Living Legends. She was also the first African-American woman to conduct the Los Angeles Philharmonic, as a guest conductor in 1996.

As a violinist, Devereaux has performed with Chaka Khan, Stevie Wonder, Alicia Keys, Bruno Mars, Justin Timberlake, Whitney Houston, and K².
