= Up with People at the Super Bowl =

Appearances by musical organization Up with People during the Super Bowl halftime show

The Super Bowl is the annual championship game of the National Football League (NFL). The organization Up with People performed in five Super Bowl halftime shows (headlining four of them), and additionally performed in one Super Bowl pre-game show. In addition, in one of the years that they performed as the halftime headliners, Up with People accompanied Tom Sullivan in performing "The Star-Spangled Banner" (the national anthem of the United States) before the game. Up with People has performed in more Super Bowl halftime shows and had more overall Super Bowl performances than any other act.

Up with People's halftime appearances took place during an era in which Super Bowl halftime shows differed from the major-name performer headlined performances of more recent Super Bowls. Prior to the 1993 Super Bowl XXVII halftime show, Super Bowl halftime shows were more in line with college football halftime shows, often featuring performances by marching bands and local performers. Among the shows of this era were also performances produced by such groups as The Walt Disney Company, Air Force Entertainment (Tops In Blue), and Radio City Productions. Shows occasionally featured prominent names in entertainment, but were not centered upon the catalogues of famous headliners in the vein of more modern halftime shows.

Retrospective looks by entertainment critics have given an overwhelmingly negative reception to the Super Bowl performances of Up with People.

== Super Bowl V halftime show (1971) ==
Up with People were included as performers in the Super Bowl V halftime show, which was headlined by the Southeast Missouri State Marching Band with Anita Bryant as a guest.

== Super Bowl X performance of "The Star-Spangled Banner" (1976) ==
At Super Bowl X, Up with People accompanied Tom Sullivan in performing "The Star-Spangled Banner" (the national anthem of the United States) before the start of the game. Up with People also headlined the halftime show for Super Bowl X.

== Super Bowl X halftime show (1976) ==
Super Bowl X halftime show
- Part of: Super Bowl X
- Date: January 18, 1976
- Location: Miami, Florida
- Venue: Miami Orange Bowl
- Theme: 200 Years and Just a Baby: A Tribute to America's Bicentennial
- Headliner: Up with People

Super Bowl halftime show chronology
IX (1975)	X (1976)	XI (1977)

The Super Bowl X halftime show was performed by Up with People, marking the first Super Bowl halftime show not to have a marching band as its headlining act. Taking place the year of the United States Bicentennial, the performance's theme was "200 Years and Just a Baby: A Tribute to America's Bicentennial". Up with People had also joined Tom Sullivan in performing the national anthem before the start of the game.

=== Setlist ===
- "Good Time Neighborhood Band"
- "200 Years and Just A Baby"
- Medley: "Rippin' Along"/"Rock Around the Clock"
- Medley: "Take Me Home Country Roads"/"City of New Orleans"/"Philadelphia Freedom"/"200 Years and Just A Baby" (reprise)
- "America The Beautiful"

=== Retrospective critical reception ===
In a 2012 article for Entertainment Weekly, Chris Nashawaty named the show as one of the worst Super Bowl halftime shows up through the 2011 halftime show. Nashawaty characterized the show as consisting of "squeaky-clean, milk-drinking musical numbers". Nashawaty criticized Up with People in general, calling them a, "Benetton-ad collection of students from all over the world gathered together to make the cast of Fame look like hardened criminals." and further opining, "if you're too young to remember Up With People, let's put it this way — they are the music that gets played in hell’s waiting room." In a 2010 article for Bleacher Report, Tim McGhee criticized the performance, quipping, "it was as if your church's choir had taken off the robes to reveal Republican fashions and Mister Rogers was the choreographer."

== Super Bowl XIV halftime show (1980) ==
Super Bowl XIV halftime show
- Part of: Super Bowl XIV
- Date: January 20, 1980
- Location: Pasadena, California
- Venue: Rose Bowl
- Theme: A Salute to the Big Band Era
- Headliner: Up with People and Grambling State University Marching Bands

Super Bowl halftime show chronology
XIII (1979)	XIV (1980)	XV (1981)

The Super Bowl XIV halftime show was performed by Up with People and the Grambling State University Marching Bands. Its theme was "A Salute to the Big Band Era".

=== Setlist ===
- "We Are Many, We Are One"
- Big Band Medley: "Jukebox Saturday Night"/"Don't Sit Under the Apple Tree"/"Bandstand Boogie"/"Pennsylvania 6-5000"/"Sentimental Journey"/"Come On Get Happy"/"It Don't Mean a Thing"
- "Let's Conga"
- "Beer Barrel Polka"
- "Johnny B. Goode"
- "I'll Be Seeing You"
- Medley: "Chattanooga Choo-Choo"/"Full of the Power"
- "Up With People"

=== Contemporary critical reception ===
Harry Missildine of The Spokesman-Review called that show "outstanding", and opined that it was largely more "exciting" than the play during the first half of the game. Lane Crockett, the entertainment editor for Shreveport's Time Times wrote positively of the "effortlessness" of the performance.

== Super Bowl XVI halftime show (1982) ==
Super Bowl XVI halftime show
- Part of: Super Bowl XVI
- Date: January 24, 1982
- Location: Pontiac, Michigan
- Venue: Pontiac Silverdome
- Theme: A Salute to the 1960s and Motown
- Headliner: Up with People

Super Bowl halftime show chronology
XV (1981)	XVI (1982)	XVII (1983)

The Super Bowl XVI halftime show was the third of four halftime shows which Up with People headlined. Its theme was "A Salute to the 1960s and Motown". The show featured songs of the Motown genre, as well as songs from the 1960s in general. That year's Super Bowl took place in Pontiac, Michigan, near the city of Detroit, where the genre Motown traced its roots. The show lasted thirteen minutes.

=== Logistics ===
Up with People's cast featured more than 430 individuals from 24 nations. The performers spent more than three weeks in the Detroit area in advance of the game, with some rehearsal taking place at an indoor facility located at the University of Michigan. The show featured a modular set erected on the playing field.

=== Setlist ===
- Medley: "The Twist"/"Cool Jerk"/"Monster Mash"/"Itsy Bitsy Teeny Weeny Yellow Polka-Dot Bikini"/"Wipeout"/"Surfin' U.S.A."
- Medley: "Little GTO"/"Dancing in the Street"/"Uptight (Everything's Alright)"/"Stop! In the Name of Love"/"I Heard It Through the Grapevine"/"Ain't No Mountain High Enough"
- Medley: "Scarborough Fair"/"Michael, Row the Boat Ashore"/"Abraham, Martin & John"
- Medley: "Can't Buy Me Love"/"All You Need Is Love"/"Hey Jude"/"Let The Sunshine In"
- "Up with People"

=== Critical reception ===
==== Contemporary reception ====
Joe Lapointe of the Detroit Free Press called the show, "ironic and sort of sad". Roger Fischer of the Tampa Bay Times likened the show to, "a Barbara Mandrell and the Mandrell Sisters prime time affair", and opined that the broadcast time allotted to showing the performance would have been better used to provide further game analysis. Geoff Hobson of the Press & Sun-Bulletin wrote negatively of the show. He criticized the decision to have Up with People perform, instead of the marching band of the University of Michigan (located relatively near the site of that year's Super Bowl). He opined that the show, "should have been shot for impersonating a Norman Rockwell painting. Painted smiles on painted faces perched on platinum peaks. Singing cliches in outfits that looked older than the songs they sang from the 1960s."

==== Retrospective reception ====
In a 2010 retrospective look at Super Bowl halftime shows, the San Francisco Chronicle ranked the Super XVI halftime show as the worst in history, up through 2010. While the same article was critical of all of Up with People's appearances, it considered their 1982 halftime appearance to be the worst among them, writing, "The group's ‘Salute to Motown and the 1960s’ was the worst of its four Super Bowl appearances. The performances featured the whitest people in the world performing music mostly identified with African-American culture. Imagine watching the cast of ‘Bonanza’ performing in a Tyler Perry play". In response to this piece, in 2013, Doug Williams of ESPN noted, "to be fair, Up With People had several African-American performers that year". In a 2013 article, Sports Illustrated ranked the show as the seventh-worst halftime show (up through 2012), writing that the show, "featured the band's super smiley/creepy attitude".

Contrarily, a 2012 article by the conservative outlet The Washington Times article gave the performance a positive retrospective reception, ranking it the ninth-best Super Bowl halftime show up through 2012. This article considered it to be enjoyably wholesome in comparison to more modern Super Bowl halftime show fare, writing that Up with People, "were as inoffensive as puppies eating ice cream and apple pie". Additionally, a 2017 mlive article by Edward Pevos considered the show to have been "fun".

== Super Bowl XX halftime show (1986) ==
Super Bowl XX halftime show
- Part of: Super Bowl XX
- Date: January 26, 1986
- Location: New Orleans, Louisiana
- Venue: Louisiana Superdome
- Theme: Beat of the Future
- Headliner: Up with People
- Director: John Gonzalez

Super Bowl halftime show chronology
XIX (1985)	XX (1986)	XXI (1987)

The Super Bowl XX halftime show was the fourth (and final) Super Bowl halftime show headlined by Up with People, and the fifth overall Super Bowl halftime show in which they performed. The theme of the show was "Beat of the Future". The show itself was given the title "Room for Everyone".

=== Logistics ===
The show was directed by John Gonzalez. Up with People's music director for the show was Annette Wilkins. Up with People's cast for the show featured between 500 and members.

The 10-ton, 81,000 square feet (7,500 m^{2}) stage utilized for the performance was transported to the venue from an airport near New Orleans Airport at midnight several days before the game, with some streets being closed and a police escort accompanying the convoy of seven trucks carrying the oversize load of the stage. A three minute commercial break before the performance was allotted for the set-up of the stage.

For the performance, a gondola carrying 25,000 pounds (11,000 kg) of lighting equipment was lowered from the stadium's rafters. Five tons of theatrical lighting was used in the performance. The NFL refused to allow Up with People to turn off the venue's stadium lighting, fearing that there would be a risk that the lighting might fail to turn back on after the performance. To deal with this, blackout screens were placed to help darken the venue.

Space-focused artist Robert McCall (who worked with NASA) designed the sets for the show. Some of the individuals that had organized the 1984 Summer Olympics closing ceremony helped to come up ideas for incorporating crowd participation into the show.

The show was scheduled to last 12 minutes.

There were reports that Up with People was given US$30 million in return for organizing the halftime show.

=== Synopsis ===
The halftime performance was dedicated in memory of Martin Luther King Jr. It featured a taped segment with Bill Cosby and Lily Tomlin encouraging Americans to participate in the upcoming Hands Across America demonstration.

In the performance, dancers acted out various scenes portraying the future. The setlist was a mix of slower-paced songs and up-beat tunes. The show's setlist featured contemporary 1980s songs.

=== Setlist ===
- "Beat of the Future"
- "Talkin' With My Feet"
- Medley: "Born in the U.S.A."/"The Power of Love"/"I Just Called to Say I Love You"/"Theme from Footloose"
- Medley: "Room For Everyone"/"We'll Be There"

=== Critical reception ===
==== Contemporary reception ====
In an article negative towards the performance, Dick Shippy of the Akron Beacon Journal called the show, "one of the dumbest halftime shows ever conceived". Shippy called the show "ludicrous". He criticized the inclusion of the appeal for participation in Hands Across America (a demonstration against hunger in the United States), writing, "there could be no more inappropriate place for such an appeal than a Super Bowl game. Anything connected with Super Bowl and Super Bowl Week screams of conspicuous consumption." Shippy went on to criticize the dedication of the performance to Martin Luther King Jr., writing, "only a little bit behind in the bitter irony category was the Up with People halftime tribute to Dr. Martin Luther King Jr. Do you have a feeling that a pitch for brotherhood, made at a Roman circus, is something less than heartfelt?"

Ahead of the game, Alan Greenberg of the Hartford Courant was critical of the decision to again have Up with People perform the halftime show, opining that Up with People, "is a horribly bad, boring, group that always succeeds in making even the worst NFL game seem interesting by comparison". Also ahead of the game, Bill Modoono of The Pittsburgh Press noted that the "perpetual cheeriness" of Up with People makes some viewers, "nauseous".

NFL executives held a debriefing meeting the morning after Super Bowl XX. Expressing his profound displeasure, commissioner Pete Rozelle reportedly opened the meeting with the following statement: "There are three words I never want to hear again: Up...With...People."

==== Retrospective reception ====
In a 2013 Bleacher Report article, Matt King ranked the Super Bowl XX halftime show as the fifth-worst halftime show up to the previous year. A 2017 mlive article by Edward Pevos considered the mix of slower songs and upbeat tunes to be "bizarre", and opined that, despite its theme, the show failed to look futuristic. Pevos further opined that the show, "didn't match the fun" of Up with People's preceding performance at Super Bowl XVI. In a 2020 Lineups article, Tyler Worthington ranked this the sixth-worst halftime show up through 2020, writing, "Up With People is a music group that didn't do anything excited and just had us hoping that the game would get started again. This was their last performance and by the reception of these performances, I think that is for the better." In a 2013 article, Sports Illustrated ranked the show as the sixth-worst halftime show (up through 2012). Commenting on it being their last halftime performance, the magazine opined that their departure from the Super Bowl halftime scene came, "not a moment too soon."

== Super Bowl XXV pre-game show (1991) ==
Up with People performed the Super Bowl XXV pre-game show. This was their last appearance as Super Bowl performer.

== Overall retrospective critical reception of halftime performances ==
Retrospective looks at the Super Bowl halftime shows Up with People performed have been negative. A 2010 San Francisco Chronicle article opined, "I hope you were throwing the football in your front yard during halftime shows in the 1970s and early 1980s, which all seemed to feature Up With People or Carol Channing. Up With People always had a creepy-weird cultish quality, with exaggerated dance moves, brightly colored yet chaste clothing and industrial-grade happiness." In a 2013 Bleacher Report article, writer Matt King criticized the perennial inclusion of Up with People at the Super Bowl, calling them, "a bland group that sang bland music in a bland fashion". In a 2022 Adweek article, Robert Klara negatively looked back at Up with People as halftime performers, describing them as a "treacly (and overwhelmingly white) dance troupe".

In a 2021 Yardbarker article, Daniel Tran collectively ranked Up with People's four headlining Super Bowl halftime appearances as the worst halftime shows up through 2020, writing that the shows featured, "grown adults singing and dancing with cult-like enthusiasm and soulless eyes," and opining that the four shows, "will forever be the worst and probably most terrifying series of Super Bowl halftime performances ever." In a 2022 Athlon Sports article, Aaroon Allen collectively ranked Up with People's four headlining halftime appearances the 15th-worst of Super Bowl halftime shows out of 48 entries. In a 2022 Live365 article, Kathryn Milewski collectively ranked every Super Bowl halftime performance by Up with People as the fifth-worst Super Bowl halftime shows, opining,

"If you're from an older generation and remember watching this group on your television set, you may actually appreciate the Up With People performances due to the nostalgia they bring. Good for you. But for those of us born around or after the 80s, watching these shows just feels like another version of reality. What on earth is going on here? Why did the NFL let a cheesy nonprofit group of young people throw high school showchoir-esque numbers in the middle of American TV's biggest night? Why is watching it now just so unbelievably funny?"

In a 2016 Houston Chronicle piece, characterizing Up With People's shows as belonging to a more "innocent era" of Super Bowl entertainment, Ken Hoffman described Up With People as, "the squeaky clean, optimistic and, sure, corny and slap-happy group of fresh-faced entertainers whose most sinister wardrobe malfunction was maybe a tilted American flag lapel pin."

== In pop culture ==
In a parody of Up With People's halftime appearances on the long-running cartoon series The Simpsons, the fictional group "Hooray for Everything" (the show's recurring parody of Up With People) performed a football game halftime show with the theme "A Salute to the Western Hemisphere: The Dancin’-est Hemisphere of All!" in the season two episode "Bart vs. Thanksgiving".
