= List of Super Bowl halftime shows =

Halftime shows are common during many American football games. Entertainment during the Super Bowl, the annual championship game of the National Football League (NFL), is one of the most notable of these performances and is usually very widely watched on television in the United States.

== Background ==
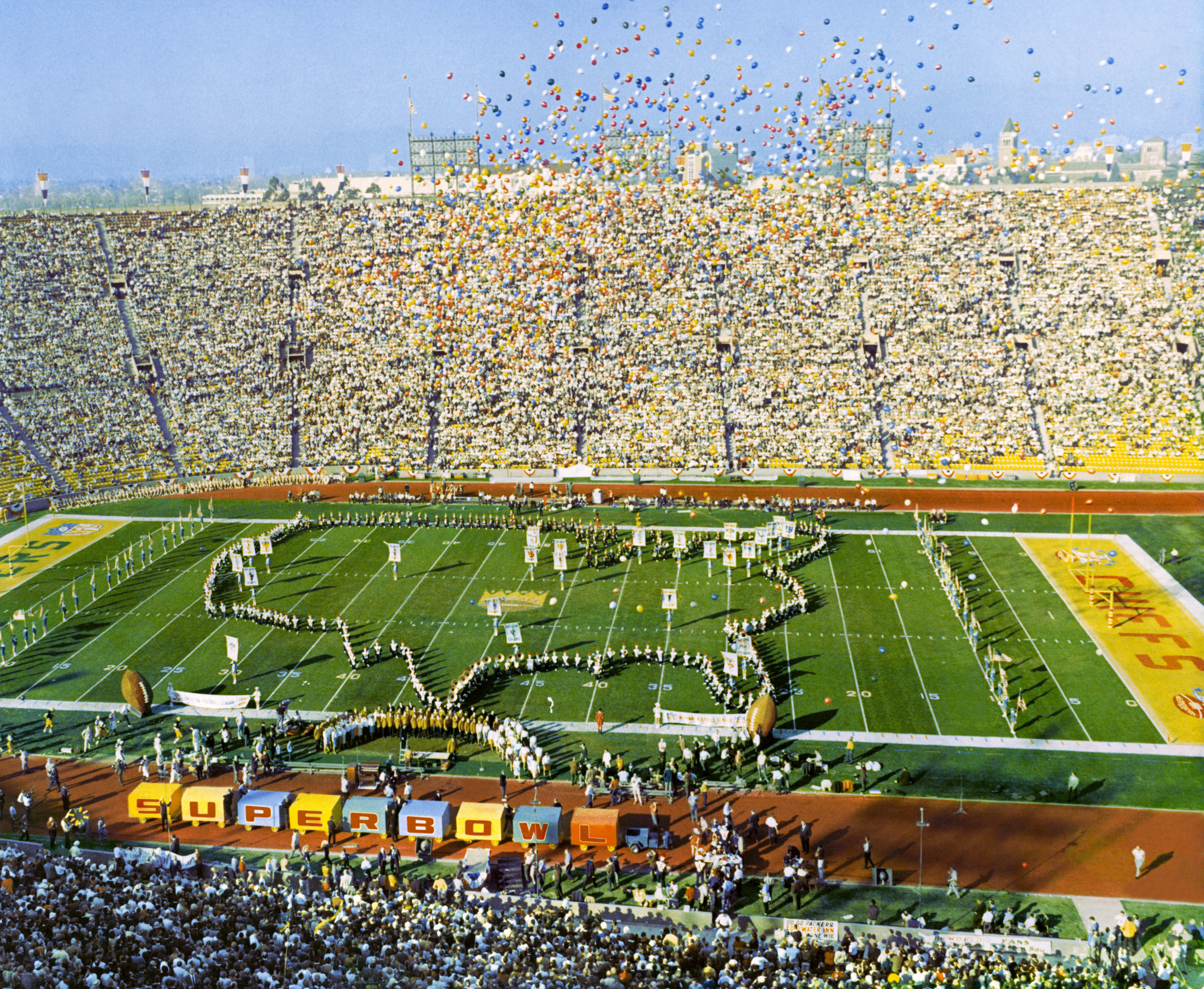
View of the halftime show at Super Bowl I

During most of the Super Bowl's first decade (starting on January 15, 1967), the halftime show featured a college marching band. The show's second decade featured a more varied show, often featuring drill teams and other performance ensembles; the group Up with People produced and starred in four of the performances. Starting in the 1990s, to counter other networks' efforts to counterprogram the game, the show was headlined by popular music artists each year, including New Kids on the Block, Michael Jackson, Gloria Estefan, Clint Black, Patti LaBelle, and Tony Bennett.

Starting with Super Bowl XXXII in 1998, commercial sponsors presented the halftime show; within five years, the tradition of having a theme, that began with Super Bowl III, ended, replaced by major music productions by arena rock bands and other high-profile acts. However, following the Super Bowl XXVI halftime broadcast in 1992, which was successfully challenged in viewership by a Fox broadcast of an episode of In Living Color, the NFL opted to include the use of popular culture spectacles annually. In the six years immediately following an incident at Super Bowl XXXVIII where Justin Timberlake exposed one of Janet Jackson's breasts in an alleged "wardrobe malfunction", all of the halftime shows consisted of a performance by one artist or group, with the musicians in that era primarily being rock artists from the 1960s, 1970s and 1980s. These shows were considered "family-friendly" and the time of these performances was described as "the age of reactionary halftime shows".

Since Super Bowl XLV, the halftime show has returned to featuring popular contemporary musicians, with the typical format featuring a single headline artist collaborating with a small number of guest performers.

The NFL does not pay the halftime show performers an appearance fee, though it covers all expenses for the performers and their entourage of band members, management, technical crew, security personnel, family, and friends. The Super Bowl XXVII halftime show with Michael Jackson provided an exception, as the NFL and Frito-Lay agreed to make a donation and provide commercial time for Jackson's Heal the World Foundation. According to Nielsen SoundScan data, the halftime performers regularly experience significant spikes in weekly album sales and paid digital downloads due to the exposure. For Super Bowl XLIX, it was reported by The Wall Street Journal that league officials asked representatives of potential acts if they would be willing to provide financial compensation to the NFL in exchange for their appearance, in the form of either an up-front fee, or a cut of revenue from concert performances made after the Super Bowl. While these reports were denied by an NFL spokeswoman, the request had, according to the Journal, received a "chilly" response from those involved.

The process of deciding a headline performer for the Super Bowl halftime show is disputed. According to The Charlotte Observer, it begins with a panel that includes the NFL's director of entertainment, members of its production company, and the halftime show's director and producer. A short list of potential performers is created and given to the Super Bowl's host city, who makes the final decision. However, members of its host committee claimed that a headline performer is selected solely by the league, and they are notified on who was chosen in the same manner as the general public.

On August 13, 2019, the NFL announced a partnership with Shawn "Jay-Z" Carter and his entertainment company Roc Nation to be named the league's live music entertainment strategist. In that role, Jay-Z and his firm became co-producers and consultants of the Super Bowl halftime show, allowing them to be involved in selecting music for NFL usage and choosing entertainers to perform in televised promotional spots throughout the season. Seth Dudowsky, the league's music executive, stated that they "wanted to start to focus on leading to culture," and "Whether that's the culture of the city, what's happening in culture at large and then focusing on it so that what we're doing feels culturally relevant and using that platform for artists to be able to be themselves and show their art on stage. We want them to feel empowered."

== Viewership ==
According to Billboard magazine, these are the highest-viewed Super Bowl halftime shows:

1. Kendrick Lamar in 2025 (133.5 million viewers)

2. Michael Jackson in 1993 (133.4 million viewers)

3. Usher in 2024 (129.3 million viewers)

4. Bad Bunny in 2026 (128.2 million viewers)

The viewership for livestreams of the halftime shows, including YouTube's livestream in 2026, is excluded as Nielsen did not measure any livestream viewership for alternative halftime show broadcast, Nielsen only measures the linear networks that carried the Super Bowl.

For the NBC and NBC Sports broadcast of the 2026 halftime show, the total social-media consumption of the halftime show featuring Bad Bunny set a record with 4.157 global billion views in the first 24 hours, a 137-percent increase over the 2025 halftime show.

The social media figures for 2026 include fans, owned platforms, broadcast partners and influencers. The NFL stated more than 55% of all social views came from international markets.

Spanish Broadcast

Super Bowl XLVIII included the first Spanish-language broadcast for a Super Bowl and halftime show.

According to The Guardian, the 2026 halftime show starring Bad Bunny was reported have increased the Spanish-language audience in the US. Telemundo averaged 3.3 million viewers, making it the most-watched Super Bowl Spanish-language broadcast in the United States. The audience peaked during the halftime show, averaging 4.8 million viewers, making it the most-watched Super Bowl halftime in Spanish-language history in the US.

== History ==
The following is a list of the performers, producers, themes, and sponsors for each Super Bowl game's show. This list does not include national anthem performers, which are listed in the article List of national anthem performers at the Super Bowl.

=== 1960s ===
| Super Bowl | Date | Location | Theme | Performers | Producer | Setlist | Ref. |
|---|---|---|---|---|---|---|---|
| I | January 15, 1967 | Los Angeles Memorial Coliseum (Los Angeles, California) | —N/a | University of Arizona Symphonic Marching Band; Grambling State University Marching Band; Al Hirt; Anaheim High School Ana-Hi-Steppers Drill Team and Flag Girls | Tommy Walker | (The University of Arizona Symphonic Marching Band): "The Sound of Music"; Medley: "Way Down Yonder in New Orleans/When the Saints Go Marching In" (with Al Hirt); "Bugler's Holiday" (with Al Hirt); "Bury Me Not on the Lone Prairie"; "William Tell Overture" (excerpt); "The Liberty Bell March"; "Marching Along Together"; "This Is My Country" (with Grambling College Marching Band and UCLA Men's Glee Club) | |
| II | January 14, 1968 | Miami Orange Bowl (Miami, Florida) | —N/a | Grambling State University Marching Band | —N/a | —N/a | |
| III | January 12, 1969 | Miami Orange Bowl (Miami, Florida) | America Thanks | Florida A&M University band; Miami-area high school bands | —N/a | —N/a | |

=== 1970s ===
| Super Bowl | Date | Location | Theme | Performer(s) | Producer | Sponsor | Setlist | Ref. |
|---|---|---|---|---|---|---|---|---|
| IV | January 11, 1970 | Tulane Stadium (New Orleans, Louisiana) | Tribute to Mardi Gras | Marguerite Piazza; Doc Severinsen; Al Hirt; Lionel Hampton; Carol Channing; Southern University Marching Band | —N/a | —N/a | "Do You Know What It Means to Miss New Orleans?"; "When the Saints Go Marching In" | |
| V | January 17, 1971 | Miami Orange Bowl (Miami, Florida) | —N/a | Southeast Missouri State Marching Band; Anita Bryant; Up with People | —N/a | —N/a | —N/a | |
| VI | January 16, 1972 | Tulane Stadium (New Orleans, Louisiana) | Salute to Louis Armstrong | Ella Fitzgerald; Carol Channing; Al Hirt; USAFA Cadet Chorale; U.S. Marine Corps Drill Team | Jim Skinner | —N/a | "Mack the Knife" (Ella Fitzgerald and Al Hirt) | |
| VII | January 14, 1973 | Los Angeles Memorial Coliseum (Los Angeles, California) | Happiness Is | University of Michigan Marching Band; Woody Herman; Andy Williams | Tommy Walker | —N/a | (partial): "Put on a Happy Face" (University of Michigan Marching Band); "Woodchopper's Ball" (University of Michigan Marching Band with Woody Herman); "La Virgen de la Macarena" (University of Michigan Marching Band); "This Land Is Your Land" (University of Michigan Marching Band); "Marmalade, Molasses & Honey" (Andy Williams); "People" (Andy Williams) | |
| VIII | January 13, 1974 | Rice Stadium (Houston, Texas) | A Musical America | University of Texas Longhorn Band; Judy Mallett (Miss Texas 1973) on fiddle | Jim Skinner | —N/a | —N/a | |
| IX | January 12, 1975 | Tulane Stadium (New Orleans, Louisiana) | Tribute to Duke Ellington | Mercer Ellington and Grambling State University Marching Bands | Jim Skinner | —N/a | —N/a | |
| X (show) | January 18, 1976 | Miami Orange Bowl (Miami, Florida) | 200 Years and Just a Baby: A Tribute to America's Bicentennial | Up with People | —N/a | —N/a | "Good Time Neighborhood Band"; "200 Years and Just a Baby"; "Cindy"; Medley: "Rippin' Along"/"Rock Around The Clock"; Medley: "Take Me Home Country Roads"/"City of New Orleans"/"Philadelphia Freedom"/"200 Years and Just a Baby" (reprise); "America The Beautiful" | |
| XI | January 9, 1977 | Rose Bowl (Pasadena, California) | It's a Small World | Los Angeles Unified All-City Band with the New Mouseketeers and Audience card stunt | The Walt Disney Company | —N/a | "It's a Big Wide Wonderful World"; "Paloma Blanca"; "Mickey Mouse Club Theme"; "If You Add All the Love in the World"; "It's a Small World"; "Brotherhood of Man" | |
| XII | January 15, 1978 | Louisiana Superdome (New Orleans, Louisiana) | From Paris to Paris of America | Tyler Apache Belles Drill Team; The Apache Band; Pete Fountain; Al Hirt | —N/a | —N/a | —N/a | |
| XIII | January 21, 1979 | Miami Orange Bowl (Miami, Florida) | Salute to Caribbean | Ken Hamilton; Various Caribbean bands, including Gramacks and The Merrymen | Bob Jani | Carnival | —N/a | |

=== 1980s ===
| Super Bowl | Date | Location | Theme | Performer(s) | Producer | Sponsor | Setlist | Ref. |
|---|---|---|---|---|---|---|---|---|
| XIV (show) | January 20, 1980 | Rose Bowl (Pasadena, California) | A Salute to the Big Band Era | Up with People; Grambling State University Marching Bands | —N/a | —N/a | "We Are Many, We Are One"; Big Band Medley: "Jukebox Saturday Night"/"Don't Sit Under The Apple Tree"/"Bandstand Boogie"/"Pennsylvania 6-5000"/"Sentimental Journey"/"Come on Get Happy"/"It Don't Mean a Thing"; "Let's Conga"; "Beer Barrel Polka"; "Johnny B. Goode"; "I'll Be Seeing You"; Medley: "Chattanooga Choo-Choo"/"Full of the Power"; "Up With People" | |
| XV | January 25, 1981 | Louisiana Superdome (New Orleans, Louisiana) | Mardi Gras Festival | Southern University Marching Band; Helen O'Connell | Jim Skinner | —N/a | —N/a | |
| XVI (show) | January 24, 1982 | Pontiac Silverdome (Pontiac, Michigan) | Salute to the 1960s and Motown | Up with People | —N/a | —N/a | Medley: "The Twist"/"Cool Jerk"/"Monster Mash"/"Itsy Bitsy Teeny Weeny Yellow Polka-Dot Bikini"/"Wipeout"/"Surfin' U.S.A."; Medley: "Little GTO"/"Dancing in the Street"/"Uptight (Everything's Alright)"/"Stop! In the Name of Love"/"I Heard It Through the Grapevine"/"Ain't No Mountain High Enough"; Medley: "Scarborough Fair"/"Michael, Row the Boat Ashore"/"Abraham, Martin & John"; Medley: "Can't Buy Me Love"/"All You Need Is Love"/"Hey Jude"/"Let the Sunshine In"; "Up With People" | |
| XVII | January 30, 1983 | Rose Bowl (Pasadena, California) | KaleidoSUPERscope | Los Angeles Super Drill Team | Bob Jani | —N/a | "Look to the Rainbow"; "The Music Goes Round and Round"; "Gloria"; "The Windmills of Your Mind"; "Fantaisie-Impromptu" (excerpt); "Somewhere over the Rainbow" | |
| XVIII | January 22, 1984 | Tampa Stadium (Tampa, Florida) | Salute to Superstars of Silver Screen | University of Florida and Florida State University Marching Bands | The Walt Disney Company | —N/a | Introduction by Phyllis George; "Hooray for Hollywood"; "You Oughta Be in Pictures"; "Steppin' Out with My Baby"; "Puttin' on the Ritz"; "42nd Street"; "When You Wish Upon a Star" | |
| XIX | January 20, 1985 | Stanford Stadium (Stanford, California) | World of Children's Dreams | Tops in Blue | Air Force Entertainment | —N/a | —N/a | |
| XX (show) | January 26, 1986 | Louisiana Superdome (New Orleans, Louisiana) | Beat of the Future | Up with People | —N/a | —N/a | "Beat of the Future"; "Talkin' with My Feet"; Medley: "Born in the U.S.A."/"The Power of Love"/"I Just Called to Say I Love You"/"Theme from Footloose"; Medley: "Room for Everyone"/"We'll Be There" | |
| XXI | January 25, 1987 | Rose Bowl (Pasadena, California) | Salute to Hollywood's 100th Anniversary – The World of Make Believe | George Burns; Mickey Rooney; Grambling State University and USC Marching Bands; Disney characters; Southern California-area high school drill teams and dancers | The Walt Disney Company | —N/a | "Strike Up The Band"; "Ghost Riders in the Sky"; Theme songs from Bonanza, Indiana Jones, and Footloose; Hoedown song; "Cheek to Cheek"; "What a Feeling" (Theme from Flashdance); "That's Entertainment"; "Somewhere Over the Rainbow"; "When You Wish Upon a Star" | |
| XXII | January 31, 1988 | Jack Murphy Stadium (San Diego, California) | Something Grand | Chubby Checker; The Rockettes; 88 grand piano players (various); The combined San Diego State University Marching Aztecs, California State University Northridge Marching Band and USC Marching Bands | Radio City Music Hall | —N/a | 88 Grand Pianos performance; "The Super Bowl Super-Band Swing"; "It Don't Mean A Thing (If It Ain't Got That Swing)" (with The Rockettes); "I Got Rhythm" (with The Rockettes); Medley: "Let's Twist Again"/"The Super Bowl Twist (Peppermint Twist)" (with Chubby Checker) | |
| XXIII (show) | January 22, 1989 | Joe Robbie Stadium (Miami Gardens, Florida) | 1950s Rock and Roll (Be Bop Bamboozled in 3-D) | Elvis Presto; South Florida-area dancers and performers | MagicCom Entertainment; Dan Witkowski | Diet Coke | Introduction by Bob Costas and 3-D commercial for Diet Coke; "Rock This Town"; Audience participation card trick; "Tutti Frutti"; "Do You Love Me"; "Devil with a Blue Dress On"; "Great Balls of Fire"; "Greased Lightnin'"; "True Love" | |

=== 1990s ===
| Super Bowl | Date | Location | Theme | Headliner(s) | Special guests(s) | Producer | Sponsor | Setlist | Ref. |
|---|---|---|---|---|---|---|---|---|---|
| XXIV | January 28, 1990 | Louisiana Superdome (New Orleans, Louisiana) | 40 Years of Happiness (Salute to Peanuts) | Nicholls State University Marching Band; Southern University Marching Band; USL Marching Band | Pete Fountain; Doug Kershaw; Irma Thomas | Despie & Miziker Productions | —N/a | "(Up A) Lazy River"; "Waiting for the Robert E. Lee"; "Here Comes the Showboat"; "When the Saints Go Marching In" (Pete Fountain on clarinet); "Happy Birthday to You" | |
| XXV | January 27, 1991 | Tampa Stadium (Tampa, Florida) | Small World Tribute to 25 Years of the Super Bowl | —N/a | New Kids on the Block; Disney characters; Warren Moon; 2,000 local children; Audience (card stunt) | The Walt Disney Company | Walt Disney World; The Coca-Cola Company | "It's a Small World After All"/ "We Are the World"/ "I'd Like to Teach the World to Sing" (children); "Step by Step" (NKOTB); "This One's For The Children" (NKOTB and children); "It's a Small World After All" (children) | |
| XXVI (Note: Super Bowl XXVI was the first time halftime counterprogramming drew significant audience away from the game, with 22 million viewers watching a In Living Color special, prompting NFL to acknowledge the dated format of the show and the need to address changing audiences the following year.) | January 26, 1992 | Hubert H. Humphrey Metrodome (Minneapolis, Minnesota) | Winter Magic, salute to 1992 Winter Olympics | —N/a | Gloria Estefan; Olympic figure skaters Brian Boitano and Dorothy Hamill; Members of the 1980 US Olympic Hockey Team; University of Minnesota Marching Band | Timberline Productions | —N/a | "Winter Magic"; "Walking in a Winter Wonderland"; "Dance of the Sugar Plum Fairy"; "Frosty" (University of Minnesota Marching Band); "One Moment in Time" (featuring Brian Boitano and Dorothy Hamill); "Don't Stop Me Now" (featuring members of the 1980 US Olympic Hockey Team); "Live for Loving You" (Gloria Estefan); "Get on Your Feet" (Gloria Estefan) | |
| XXVII (show) | January 31, 1993 | Rose Bowl (Pasadena, California) | An Unprecedented Super Bowl Spectacular starring Michael Jackson | Michael Jackson | —N/a | Radio City Music Hall | Lay's | "Jam" (Michael Jackson); "Billie Jean" (Michael Jackson); "Black or White" (Michael Jackson); "We Are the World" (children's choir); "Heal the World" (Michael Jackson) | |
| XXVIII | January 30, 1994 | Georgia Dome (Atlanta, Georgia) | Rockin' Country Sunday | Clint Black; Tanya Tucker; Travis Tritt; The Judds | | Select Productions | Wavy Lay's | "Tuckered Out" (Clint Black); "It's a Little Too Late" (Tanya Tucker); "T-R-O-U-B-L-E" (Travis Tritt); "No One Else on Earth" (Wynonna Judd); "Love Can Build a Bridge" (The Judds, joined by the other artists and special guests for the final verse) | |
| XXIX | January 29, 1995 | Joe Robbie Stadium (Miami Gardens, Florida) | Indiana Jones and the Temple of the Forbidden Eye | Indiana Jones; Patti LaBelle; Tony Bennett; Miami Sound Machine | Marion Ravenwood; Teddy Pendergrass; Arturo Sandoval | The Walt Disney Company | Doritos | "Release Yourself" (Patti LaBelle); "Caravan" (Tony Bennett, Arturo Sandoval and Miami Sound Machine); "New Attitude" (Patti LaBelle); "Can You Feel The Love Tonight" (Patti LaBelle and Tony Bennett) | |
| XXX (show) | January 28, 1996 | Sun Devil Stadium (Tempe, Arizona) | Take Me Higher: A Celebration of 30 Years of the Super Bowl | Diana Ross | —N/a | Radio City Music Hall | Oscar Mayer | A medley of the following songs: "Stop In The Name Of Love"; "You Keep Me Hangin' On"; "Baby Love"; "You Can't Hurry Love"; "Why Do Fools Fall in Love"; "Chain Reaction"; "Reach Out and Touch (Somebody's Hand)"; "Ain't No Mountain High Enough"; "I Will Survive"; "Take Me Higher" | |
| XXXI (show) | January 26, 1997 | Louisiana Superdome (New Orleans, Louisiana) | Blues Brothers Bash | The Blues Brothers (Dan Aykroyd, John Goodman and Jim Belushi) | ZZ Top; James Brown; Catherine Crier ("news" intro) | Select Productions; Radio City; House of Blues | Oscar Mayer | "Everybody Needs Somebody to Love" (The Blues Brothers); "Soul Man" (The Blues Brothers); "I Got You (I Feel Good)" (James Brown); "Get Up (I Feel Like Being a) Sex Machine" (James Brown); "Tush" (ZZ Top); "Legs" (ZZ Top); "Gimme Some Lovin'" (all performers joined) | |
| XXXII | January 25, 1998 | Qualcomm Stadium (San Diego, California) | Salute to Motown's 40th Anniversary | Boyz II Men; Smokey Robinson; Martha Reeves; The Temptations; Queen Latifah | Grambling State University Marching Band | Radio City Music Hall | Royal Caribbean International; Celebrity Cruises | "Get Ready" (The Temptations); "I Can't Help Myself" (The Temptations); "The Tracks of My Tears" (Smokey Robinson); "My Girl" (The Temptations with Smokey Robinson); "Heat Wave" (Martha and the Vandellas); "Paper" (Queen Latifah); "Motownphilly" (Boyz II Men); "A Song for Mama" (Boyz II Men); "Dancing in the Street" (all artists joined by GSU Marching Band) | |
| XXXIII (show) | January 31, 1999 | Pro Player Stadium (Miami Gardens, Florida) | Celebration of Soul, Salsa and Swing | Gloria Estefan; Stevie Wonder | Big Bad Voodoo Daddy; Savion Glover | Radio City Music Hall | Progressive Auto Insurance | "Go Daddy O" (Big Bad Voodoo Daddy); "Sir Duke" (Stevie Wonder); "You Are The Sunshine Of My Life" (Stevie Wonder); "I Wish" (Stevie Wonder); "Oye!" (Gloria Estefan); "Turn The Beat Around" (Gloria Estefan); "You'll Be Mine (Party Time)/Another Star/My Cherie Amour" (Gloria Estefan and Stevie Wonder) | |

=== 2000s ===
| Super Bowl | Date | Location | Theme | Headliner(s) | Special guest(s) | Producer | Sponsor | Setlist | Ref. |
|---|---|---|---|---|---|---|---|---|---|
| XXXIV (show) | January 30, 2000 | Georgia Dome (Atlanta, Georgia) | Tapestry of Nations | Phil Collins; Christina Aguilera; Enrique Iglesias; Toni Braxton; Edward James Olmos (narrator) | 80-person choir (Georgia State University) | Disney | E-Trade | "Reflections of Earth" Instrumental (Walt Disney World Millennium Celebration soundtrack); "Celebrate the Future Hand in Hand" (Christina Aguilera and Enrique Iglesias); "Tapestry of Nations" Instrumental (Walt Disney World Millennium Celebration soundtrack); "Two Worlds" (Phil Collins); "We Go On" (Toni Braxton) | |
| XXXV (show) | January 28, 2001 | Raymond James Stadium (Tampa, Florida) | The Kings of Rock and Pop | Aerosmith; NSYNC | Britney Spears; Mary J. Blige; Nelly | MTV | E-Trade | Pre-recorded intro sketch with Ben Stiller, Adam Sandler, Chris Rock, Aerosmith, and NSYNC; "Bye Bye Bye" (NSYNC); "I Don't Want to Miss a Thing" (Aerosmith); "It's Gonna Be Me" (NSYNC); "Jaded" (Aerosmith); "Walk This Way" (Aerosmith, NSYNC, Britney Spears, Mary J. Blige, Nelly) | |
| XXXVI (show) | February 3, 2002 | Louisiana Superdome (New Orleans, Louisiana) | Tribute to those killed in the September 11 attacks | U2 | —N/a | Clear Channel Entertainment | E-Trade | "Beautiful Day"; "MLK"; "Where the Streets Have No Name" | |
| XXXVII (show) | January 26, 2003 | Qualcomm Stadium (San Diego, California) | —N/a | Shania Twain; No Doubt | Sting | Jimmy Iovine; Joel Gallen | AT&T Wireless | "Man! I Feel like a Woman!" (Shania Twain); "Up!" (Shania Twain); "Just a Girl" (No Doubt); "Message in a Bottle" (Sting with No Doubt) | |
| XXXVIII (show) | February 1, 2004 | Reliant Stadium (Houston, Texas) | Choose or Lose | Janet Jackson; P. Diddy; Nelly; Kid Rock; Justin Timberlake; Jessica Simpson | Spirit of Houston and Ocean of Soul marching bands | MTV | AOL TopSpeed | "The Way You Move" (Spirit of Houston and Ocean of Soul marching bands); "All for You" (Janet Jackson); "Bad Boy for Life" (P. Diddy); "Diddy" to the tune of "Mickey" (P. Diddy); "Hot in Herre" (Nelly); "Mo Money Mo Problems" (P. Diddy); "Bawitdaba" (Kid Rock); "Cowboy" (Kid Rock); "Rhythm Nation" (Janet Jackson); "Rock Your Body" (Justin Timberlake with Janet Jackson) | |
| XXXIX | February 6, 2005 | Alltel Stadium (Jacksonville, Florida) | —N/a | Paul McCartney | —N/a | Don Mischer Productions | Ameriquest Mortgage | "Drive My Car"; "Get Back"; "Live and Let Die"; "Hey Jude" | |
| XL (show) | February 5, 2006 | Ford Field (Detroit, Michigan) | —N/a | The Rolling Stones | —N/a | Don Mischer Productions | Sprint Nextel | "Start Me Up"; "Rough Justice"; "(I Can't Get No) Satisfaction" | |
| XLI (show) | February 4, 2007 | Dolphin Stadium (Miami Gardens, Florida) | —N/a | Prince | Florida A&M University Marching 100 Band | Don Mischer Productions; White Cherry Entertainment | Pepsi | "We Will Rock You" (Intro); "Let's Go Crazy"; "Baby I'm a Star"; "Proud Mary"; "1999"; "All Along the Watchtower"; "Best of You"; "Purple Rain" | |
| XLII | February 3, 2008 | University of Phoenix Stadium (Glendale, Arizona) | —N/a | Tom Petty and the Heartbreakers | —N/a | Don Mischer Productions; White Cherry Entertainment | Bridgestone | "American Girl"; "I Won't Back Down"; "Free Fallin'"; "Runnin' Down a Dream" | |
| XLIII | February 1, 2009 | Raymond James Stadium (Tampa, Florida) | —N/a | Bruce Springsteen and the E Street Band | The Miami Horns | Don Mischer Productions; White Cherry Entertainment | Bridgestone | "Tenth Avenue Freeze-Out"; "Born to Run"; "Working on a Dream"; "Glory Days" | |

=== 2010s ===
| Super Bowl | Date | Location | Headliner(s) | Special guest(s) | Director | Producer | Sponsor | Setlist | Ref. |
|---|---|---|---|---|---|---|---|---|---|
| XLIV (show) | February 7, 2010 | Sun Life Stadium (Miami Gardens, Florida) | The Who | —N/a | Hamish Hamilton | White Cherry Entertainment | Bridgestone | "Pinball Wizard"; "Baba O'Riley"; "Who Are You"; "See Me, Feel Me"; "Won't Get Fooled Again" | |
| XLV (show) | February 6, 2011 | Cowboys Stadium (Arlington, Texas) | The Black Eyed Peas | Usher; Slash; Dallas/Ft. Worth-area high school drill teams and dancers; Prairie View A&M University Marching Storm | Hamish Hamilton | Ricky Kirshner | Bridgestone | "I Gotta Feeling" (The Black Eyed Peas); "Boom Boom Pow" (The Black Eyed Peas); "Sweet Child O' Mine" (Slash and Fergie); "Pump It" (The Black Eyed Peas); "Let's Get It Started" (The Black Eyed Peas); "OMG" (Usher and will.i.am); "Where Is The Love?" (The Black Eyed Peas); "The Time (Dirty Bit)" with "I Gotta Feeling" reprise (The Black Eyed Peas) | |
| XLVI (show) | February 5, 2012 | Lucas Oil Stadium (Indianapolis, Indiana) | Madonna | LMFAO; Cirque du Soleil; Nicki Minaj; M.I.A.; Cee Lo Green; Andy Lewis; Avon High School Drumline; Center Grove High School Drumline; Fishers High School Drumline; Franklin Central High School Drumline; Southern University Dancing Dolls; 200-person choir consisting of Indianapolis locals | Hamish Hamilton | Ricky Kirshner | Bridgestone | "Vogue" (Madonna); "Music" / "Party Rock Anthem" / "Sexy and I Know It" (Madonna with LMFAO); "Give Me All Your Luvin'" (Madonna with Nicki Minaj and M.I.A.); "Open Your Heart" / "Express Yourself" (Madonna with Cee Lo Green); "Like a Prayer" (Madonna with Cee Lo Green) | |
| XLVII (show) | February 3, 2013 | Mercedes-Benz Superdome (New Orleans, Louisiana) | Beyoncé | Destiny's Child | Hamish Hamilton | Ricky Kirshner | Pepsi | "Run the World (Girls)" (intro) / Vince Lombardi "Excellence" speech voiceover; "Love On Top" (chorus a cappella) (Beyoncé); "Crazy in Love" (Beyoncé); "End of Time" (Beyoncé); "Baby Boy" (Beyoncé); "Bootylicious" (Destiny's Child); "Independent Women Part I" (Destiny's Child); "Single Ladies (Put a Ring on It)" (Beyoncé featuring Kelly Rowland and Michelle Williams); "Halo" (Beyoncé) | |
| XLVIII (show) | February 2, 2014 | MetLife Stadium (East Rutherford, New Jersey) | Bruno Mars | Red Hot Chili Peppers | Hamish Hamilton | Ricky Kirshner | Pepsi | "Billionaire" (intro) (children's choir); "Locked Out of Heaven" (Bruno Mars); "Treasure" (Bruno Mars); "Runaway Baby" (Bruno Mars); "Give It Away" (Red Hot Chili Peppers with Bruno Mars); "Just the Way You Are" (Bruno Mars) | |
| XLIX (show) | February 1, 2015 | University of Phoenix Stadium (Glendale, Arizona) | Katy Perry | Lenny Kravitz; Missy Elliott; Arizona State University Sun Devil Marching Band | Hamish Hamilton | Ricky Kirshner | Pepsi | "Roar" (Katy Perry); "Dark Horse" (Katy Perry); "I Kissed a Girl" (Lenny Kravitz and Katy Perry); "Teenage Dream" (Katy Perry); "California Gurls" (Katy Perry); "Get Ur Freak On" (Missy Elliott and Katy Perry); "Work It" (Missy Elliott and Katy Perry); "Lose Control" (Missy Elliott); "Firework" (Katy Perry) | |
| 50 (show) | February 7, 2016 | Levi's Stadium (Santa Clara, California) | Coldplay | Beyoncé; Bruno Mars; Mark Ronson; Gustavo Dudamel; University of California Marching Band; Youth Orchestra Los Angeles | Hamish Hamilton | Ricky Kirshner | Pepsi | "Yellow" (intro a cappella) (Coldplay); "Viva la Vida" (Coldplay); "Paradise" (Coldplay); "Adventure of a Lifetime" (Coldplay); "Uptown Funk" / "Formation" (Mark Ronson, Bruno Mars, and Beyoncé) (contains elements of "U Can't Touch This" and "Crazy in Love"); "Clocks" (instrumental) (Coldplay); "Fix You"/"Up&Up" (Coldplay, Beyoncé and Bruno Mars) (contains elements of "Midnight", "Independent Women Part I", "Just the Way You Are", "Purple Rain", "Beautiful Day", and "Up&Up") | |
| LI (show) | February 5, 2017 | NRG Stadium (Houston, Texas) | Lady Gaga | —N/a | Hamish Hamilton | Ricky Kirshner | Pepsi Zero Sugar | "God Bless America"/"This Land Is Your Land"; "Dance in the Dark" (Instrumental Intro) (contains elements of "Just Dance", "LoveGame" and "Paparazzi"); "The Edge of Glory" (snippet); "Poker Face"; "Born This Way"; "Telephone"; "Just Dance"; "Million Reasons"; "Bad Romance" | |
| LII (show) | February 4, 2018 | U.S. Bank Stadium (Minneapolis, Minnesota) | Justin Timberlake | The Tennessee Kids; University of Minnesota Marching Band | Hamish Hamilton | Ricky Kirshner | Pepsi | "Filthy"; "Rock Your Body"; "Señorita"; "SexyBack"; "My Love"; "Cry Me a River"; "Suit & Tie" (Featuring the University of Minnesota Marching Band); "Until the End of Time"; "I Would Die 4 U" (Pre-recorded video of Prince [displayed on a projection screen] with Justin Timberlake); "Mirrors"; "Can't Stop the Feeling!" | |
| LIII (show) | February 3, 2019 | Mercedes-Benz Stadium (Atlanta, Georgia) | Maroon 5 | Travis Scott; Big Boi; Georgia State University Marching Band | Hamish Hamilton | Ricky Kirshner | Pepsi | "Harder to Breathe" (Maroon 5); "This Love" (Maroon 5); "Sicko Mode" (Travis Scott) (intro referencing "Sweet Victory"); "Girls Like You" (Maroon 5); "She Will Be Loved" (Maroon 5); "Kryptonite (I'm on It)" (Big Boi); "The Way You Move" (Big Boi); "Sugar" (Maroon 5); "Moves Like Jagger" (Maroon 5) | |

=== 2020s ===
| Super Bowl | Date | Location | Headliner(s) | Special guest(s) | Sign Language Performer(s) | Director | Producer | Sponsor | Setlist | Ref. |
|---|---|---|---|---|---|---|---|---|---|---|
| LIV (show) (Note: Based on online metrics, TicketSource revealed that the Super Bowl LIV halftime show starring Shakira and Jennifer Lopez was the "world's most popular" halftime show to date.) | February 2, 2020 | Hard Rock Stadium (Miami Gardens, Florida) | Shakira; Jennifer Lopez | Bad Bunny; J Balvin; Emme Muñiz | —N/a | Hamish Hamilton | Ricky Kirshner; VAMC Studios; Jay-Z; Roc Nation | Pepsi | "Dare (La La La)" (Shakira); "She Wolf" (Shakira); "Empire" (Shakira); "Kashmir" (orchestral intro); "Ojos Así" (Shakira); "Whenever, Wherever" (Shakira); "I Like It" (Shakira and Bad Bunny); "Chantaje" / "Callaíta" (Shakira and Bad Bunny); "Hips Don't Lie" (Shakira); "Jenny from the Block" (Jennifer Lopez); "Ain't It Funny (Murder Remix)" (Jennifer Lopez); "Get Right" (Jennifer Lopez); "Waiting for Tonight" (Jennifer Lopez); "Booty" / "Que Calor" / "El Anillo" / "Love Don't Cost a Thing" / "Mi Gente" (Jennifer Lopez and J Balvin); "On the Floor" (Jennifer Lopez); "Let's Get Loud" / "Born in the U.S.A." (Shakira, Jennifer Lopez, and Emme Muñiz); "Waka Waka (This Time for Africa)" / "Icha" (Shakira and Jennifer Lopez) | |
| LV (show) | February 7, 2021 | Raymond James Stadium (Tampa, Florida) | The Weeknd | —N/a | —N/a | Hamish Hamilton | Jesse Collins; Jay-Z; Roc Nation; Diversified Production Services | Pepsi | "Call Out My Name"; "Starboy"; "The Hills"; "Can't Feel My Face" (contains elements of "After Hours"); "I Feel It Coming"; "Save Your Tears"; "Earned It"; "House Of Balloons"; "Blinding Lights" | |
| LVI (show) (Note: The Super Bowl LVI halftime show starring Dr. Dre, Snoop Dogg, Eminem, Mary J. Blige, and Kendrick Lamar is the most viewed Super Bowl halftime show on YouTube with more than 322 million views on the official NFL YouTube channel alone.) (Note: It was also the first Super Bowl halftime show to win the Primetime Emmy Award for Outstanding Variety Special (Live).) | February 13, 2022 | SoFi Stadium (Inglewood, California) | Dr. Dre; Snoop Dogg; Eminem; Mary J. Blige; Kendrick Lamar | 50 Cent; Anderson .Paak | Warren Snipe; Sean Forbes | Hamish Hamilton | Jesse Collins; Jay-Z; Roc Nation; Diversified Production Services | Pepsi | "The Next Episode" (Dr. Dre and Snoop Dogg); "California Love" (Dr. Dre and Snoop Dogg); "In da Club" (50 Cent); "Family Affair" (Mary J. Blige); "No More Drama" (Mary J. Blige); "M.A.A.D City" (Kendrick Lamar); "Alright" (Kendrick Lamar); "Forgot About Dre" (Eminem and Freestyle Interlude by Kendrick Lamar); "Lose Yourself" (Eminem with Anderson .Paak on drums); "I Ain't Mad at Cha" (instrumental) (Dr. Dre); "Still D.R.E." (Dr. Dre, Snoop Dogg, Eminem, Mary J. Blige, Kendrick Lamar, and 50 Cent) | |
| LVII (show) | February 12, 2023 | State Farm Stadium (Glendale, Arizona) | Rihanna | —N/a | Justina Miles | Hamish Hamilton | Jesse Collins; Jay-Z; Roc Nation; Diversified Production Services | Apple Music | "What's My Name?" (intro); "Bitch Better Have My Money" (contains elements of "Phresh Out the Runway"); "Where Have You Been" / "Only Girl (In the World)" (contains elements of "Cockiness (Love It)"); "We Found Love" (contains elements of "S&M"); "Rude Boy (Klean Remix)" (contains elements of "Kiss It Better"); "Work"; "Wild Thoughts"; "Birthday Cake" (interlude); "Pour It Up" (contains elements of "Numb"); "Pose" (interlude); "All of the Lights"; "Run This Town"; "Umbrella"; "Diamonds" | |
| LVIII (show) | February 11, 2024 | Allegiant Stadium (Paradise, Nevada) | Usher | Alicia Keys; Jermaine Dupri; H.E.R. will.i.am Lil Jon; Ludacris; Sonic Boom of the South | Shaheem Sanchez | Hamish Hamilton | Jesse Collins; Jay-Z; Roc Nation; Diversified Production Services | Apple Music | "My Way" (intro); "Caught Up" (Usher) (contains elements of "U Don't Have to Call" and "Superstar"); "Love in This Club" (Usher); "If I Ain't Got You" (Usher and Alicia Keys); "My Boo" (Usher and Alicia Keys); "Confessions Part II" (introduced by Jermaine Dupri); "Burn" (Usher) (contains elements of "Nice & Slow"); "U Got It Bad" (Usher with H.E.R. on guitar) (contains elements of "Bad Girl"); "OMG" (Usher and will.i.am); "Turn Down for What" (Usher and Lil Jon); "Yeah!" (Usher, Lil Jon, and Ludacris) (contains elements of "Freek-a-Leek" and "Get Low") | |
| LIX (show) (Note: The Super Bowl LIX halftime show starring Kendrick Lamar is the most watched Super Bowl halftime show, with a television audience of more than 133.5 million viewers.) | February 9, 2025 | Caesars Superdome (New Orleans, Louisiana) | Kendrick Lamar | Samuel L. Jackson; SZA; Serena Williams; Mustard | Matt Maxey | Hamish Hamilton | Jesse Collins; Jay-Z; Roc Nation; Diversified Production Services | Apple Music | "Wacced Out Murals" (intro); "Bodies" (Kendrick Lamar); "Squabble Up" (Kendrick Lamar); "Humble" (Kendrick Lamar); "DNA" (Kendrick Lamar); "Euphoria" (Kendrick Lamar); "Man at the Garden" (Kendrick Lamar); "Peekaboo" (Kendrick Lamar); "Luther" (Kendrick Lamar and SZA); "All the Stars" (Kendrick Lamar and SZA); "Not Like Us" (Kendrick Lamar); "TV Off" (Kendrick Lamar and Mustard) | |
| LX (show) (Note: The Super Bowl LX halftime show starring Bad Bunny was the most nominated and most awarded halftime show in Primetime Emmy Awards history, winning seven out of its record nine nominations, including Outstanding Variety Special (Live).) | February 8, 2026 | Levi's Stadium (Santa Clara, California) | Bad Bunny | Ricky Martin; Lady Gaga | Celimar Rivera Cosme | Hamish Hamilton | Jesse Collins; Jay-Z; Roc Nation; Diversified Production Services | Apple Music | "Tití Me Preguntó" (Bad Bunny); "Yo Perreo Sola" (Bad Bunny); "Safaera" (Bad Bunny)(contains elements of "Party"); "VOY A LLeVARTE PA PR" (Bad Bunny); "EoO" (Bad Bunny); "Mónaco" (Bad Bunny); "Die with a Smile" (Lady Gaga); "BAILE INoLVIDABLE" (Bad Bunny); "NUEVAYoL" (Bad Bunny); "LO QUE LE PASÓ A HAWAii" (Bad Bunny and Ricky Martin); "El Apagón" (Bad Bunny); "CAFé CON RON" (Bad Bunny); "DtMF" (Bad Bunny) | |
| LXI (show) | February 14, 2027 | SoFi Stadium (Inglewood, California) | Jay-Z | TBD | TBD | Hamish Hamilton | Jesse Collins; Jay-Z; Roc Nation; Diversified Production Services | Apple Music | TBD | |

== Performers who have performed multiple shows ==
Excluding marching bands, the following artists have performed multiple halftime shows:

Performers who have performed multiple shows
| Performer | Total number of shows | Shows as headliner | Shows as guest performer/ non-headliner |
|---|---|---|---|
| Up with People | 5 | X (1976); XIV (1980); XVI (1982); XX (1986) | V (1971) |
| Al Hirt | 4 | —N/a | I (1967); IV (1970); VI (1972); XII (1978) |
| Justin Timberlake | 3 | XXXV (2001) (as a member of NSYNC); XXXVIII (2004); LII (2018) | —N/a |
| Carol Channing | 2 | —N/a | IV (1970); VI (1972) |
| Pete Fountain | 2 | —N/a | XII (1978); XXIV (1990) |
| Gloria Estefan | 2 | XXXIII (1999) | XXVI (1992) |
| Nelly | 2 | XXXVIII (2004) | XXXV (2001) |
| Beyoncé | 2 | XLVII (2013) | 50 (2016) |
| Bruno Mars | 2 | XLVIII (2014) | 50 (2016) |
| Mary J. Blige | 2 | LVI (2022) | XXXV (2001) |
| Usher | 2 | LVIII (2024) | XLV (2011) |
| will.i.am | 2 | XLV (2011) (as a member of the Black Eyed Peas) | LVIII (2024) |
| Kendrick Lamar | 2 | LVI (2022); LIX (2025) | —N/a |
| Bad Bunny | 2 | LX (2026) | LIV (2020) |
| Lady Gaga | 2 | LI (2017) | LX (2026) |

== See also ==
- List of AFL Grand Final pre-match performances
- List of Grey Cup halftime shows
- List of national anthem performers at the Super Bowl
- All-American Halftime Show
- 2026 FIFA World Cup final halftime show
