= Super Bowl XXXIV halftime show =

Super Bowl halftime show of 2000

- Part of: Super Bowl XXXIV
- Date: January 30, 2000
- Location: Atlanta, Georgia, U.S.
- Venue: Georgia Dome
- Theme: Tapestry of Nations
- Performers: Christina Aguilera; Phil Collins; Enrique Iglesias; Toni Braxton
- Special guest: Edward James Olmos
- Sponsor: E-Trade
- Director: Gary Paben
- Producer: The Walt Disney Company

Super Bowl halftime show chronology
XXXIII (1999)	XXXIV (2000)	XXXV (2001)

The Super Bowl XXXIV halftime show occurred on January 30, 2000, at the Georgia Dome in Atlanta, Georgia as part of Super Bowl XXXIV. It was sponsored by E-Trade and produced by The Walt Disney Company; Disney-owned ABC was the broadcaster of Super Bowl XXXIV. The show was named after and imitates the Tapestry of Nations, a parade at Epcot, a theme park in Florida, and was directed by Gary Paben who directed the original parade. The show was narrated by Mexican-American actor Edward James Olmos and featured performances by singers Christina Aguilera, Enrique Iglesias, Phil Collins, and Toni Braxton, with additional numbers performed by a choir and a full symphony orchestra conducted by Steven Byess.

== Production ==
The show was produced by The Walt Disney Company and sponsored by E-Trade.

Inspired by the Walt Disney World Millennium Celebration event held at the Epcot theme park at Walt Disney World in Florida, the show recreates the event's Tapestry of Nations parade. It was directed by the director of the original parade, Gary Paben.

The show features a choir with 80 members, 26 cymbal players and 50 set drummers and 50 marching drummers, as well as an orchestra conducted by Steven Byess. It also features 30 puppeteers.

Singers that performed on the show were Christina Aguilera, Enrique Iglesias, Phil Collins, and Toni Braxton. Actor Edward James Olmos served as the show's narrator.

== Set list ==
1. Choir and orchestra (conducted by Steven Byess): "Reflections of Earth" (Intro) (from IllumiNations: Reflections of Earth Soundtrack)
2. Christina Aguilera and Enrique Iglesias: "Celebrate the Future, Hand in Hand" (from Walt Disney World Millennium Celebration Soundtrack)
3. Choir and orchestra (conducted by Steven Byess): "Tapestry of Nations" (from Walt Disney World Millennium Celebration Soundtrack)
4. Phil Collins: "Two Worlds" (from Tarzan: An Original Walt Disney Records Soundtrack)
5. Toni Braxton: "We Go On" (from IllumiNations: Reflections of Earth Soundtrack)
