= Super Bowl XXX halftime show =

Show during American Football game

- Part of: Super Bowl XXX
- Date: January 28, 1996
- Location: Tempe, Arizona, United States
- Venue: Sun Devil Stadium
- Theme: Take Me Higher: A Celebration of 30 years of the Super Bowl
- Headliner: Diana Ross
- Sponsor: Oscar Mayer
- Producer: Radio City Music Hall

Super Bowl halftime show chronology
XXIX (1995)	XXX (1996)	XXXI (1997)

The Super Bowl XXX halftime show occurred on January 28, 1996, at the Sun Devil Stadium in Tempe, Arizona as part of Super Bowl XXX and featured American entertainer Diana Ross. The show was produced by Radio City Music Hall. The performance was entitled Take Me Higher: A Celebration of 30 years of the Super Bowl.

The show featured a number of Ross' songs, both from her solo career and her time in The Supremes. The show made use of pyrotechnics, special effects, and stadium card stunts. Ross made many costume changes throughout the performance.

== History ==
Ross had previously performed the national anthem at Super Bowl XVI in 1982.

The singer had developed a show which would last for a duration of thirteen-and-a-half minutes. Broadcaster NBC demanded that she shorten the performance to twelve minutes. After she pleaded with them to allow her to keep the performance unabbreviated, they relented to allow her a thirteen-and-a-half minute time slot.

== Synopsis ==
Ross, in a red minidress, started the performance standing on a crane, which lowered her onto the stage as sparklers were illuminated on the bottom of the crane, while singing "Stop! In the Name of Love". Hundreds of dancers occupied the field surrounding the stage, spelling out Ross' name.

Ross then sang three more songs from her days as part of The Supremes: "You Keep Me Hangin' On", "Baby Love", and "You Can't Hurry Love". "Why Do Fools Fall in Love" saw Ross make an onstage costume change into an orange and purple colored dress, before performing "Chain Reaction" and "Reach Out and Touch (Somebody's Hand)". The performance of "Ain't No Mountain High Enough" saw a yellow-robed choir joining the singer.

The show ended with Ross singing "I Will Survive" and "Take Me Higher" from her 1995 nineteenth studio album of the same name. The singer exclaimed, "Oh my, here comes my ride," as a helicopter came into the stadium and carried her off the field.

== Reception ==
=== Critical ===
Ross’ halftime performance has been ranked positively among Super Bowl halftime shows. Her performance was cited as The Weeknd's favorite halftime performance; he would later go on to perform for the Super Bowl LV halftime show.

Ross was cited for extravagant wardrobe changes during the performance.

=== Commercial ===
In the week following her performance, Ross' newest album, Take Me Higher, saw a 74% increase in sales, selling 3,000 copies in the week following the performance.

=== Rankings ===
Rankings for Super Bowl Halftime Show XXX
Publication	Accolade	Rank	Ref.
CBS Sports	Super Bowl 2018 halftime show rankings: Where every performance ranks, from worst to first	16	
Rolling Stone	Every Super Bowl Halftime Show, Ranked From Worst to Best	19	
The Oregonian	26 Super Bowl halftime shows ranked from best to worst, including J-Lo and Shakira	6	
Thrillist	The Greatest Super Bowl Halftime Shows of All Time, Ranked	4	
Vulture	Every Super Bowl Halftime Show Since 1993, Ranked	7	

== Set list ==
1. "Stop In The Name Of Love"
2. "You Keep Me Hangin' On"
3. "Baby Love"
4. "You Can't Hurry Love"
5. "Why Do Fools Fall in Love"
6. "Chain Reaction"
7. "Reach Out and Touch (Somebody's Hand)"
8. "Ain't No Mountain High Enough"
9. "I Will Survive"
10. "Take Me Higher"

== See also ==
- 1996 in American television
