= Super Bowl XLIV halftime show =

2010 show headlined by The Who

- Part of: Super Bowl XLIV
- Date: February 7, 2010
- Location: Miami Gardens, Florida
- Venue: Sun Life Stadium
- Headliner: The Who
- Sponsor: Bridgestone
- Director: Hamish Hamilton
- Producer: White Cherry Entertainment

Super Bowl halftime show chronology
XLIII (2009)	XLIV (2010)	XLV (2011)

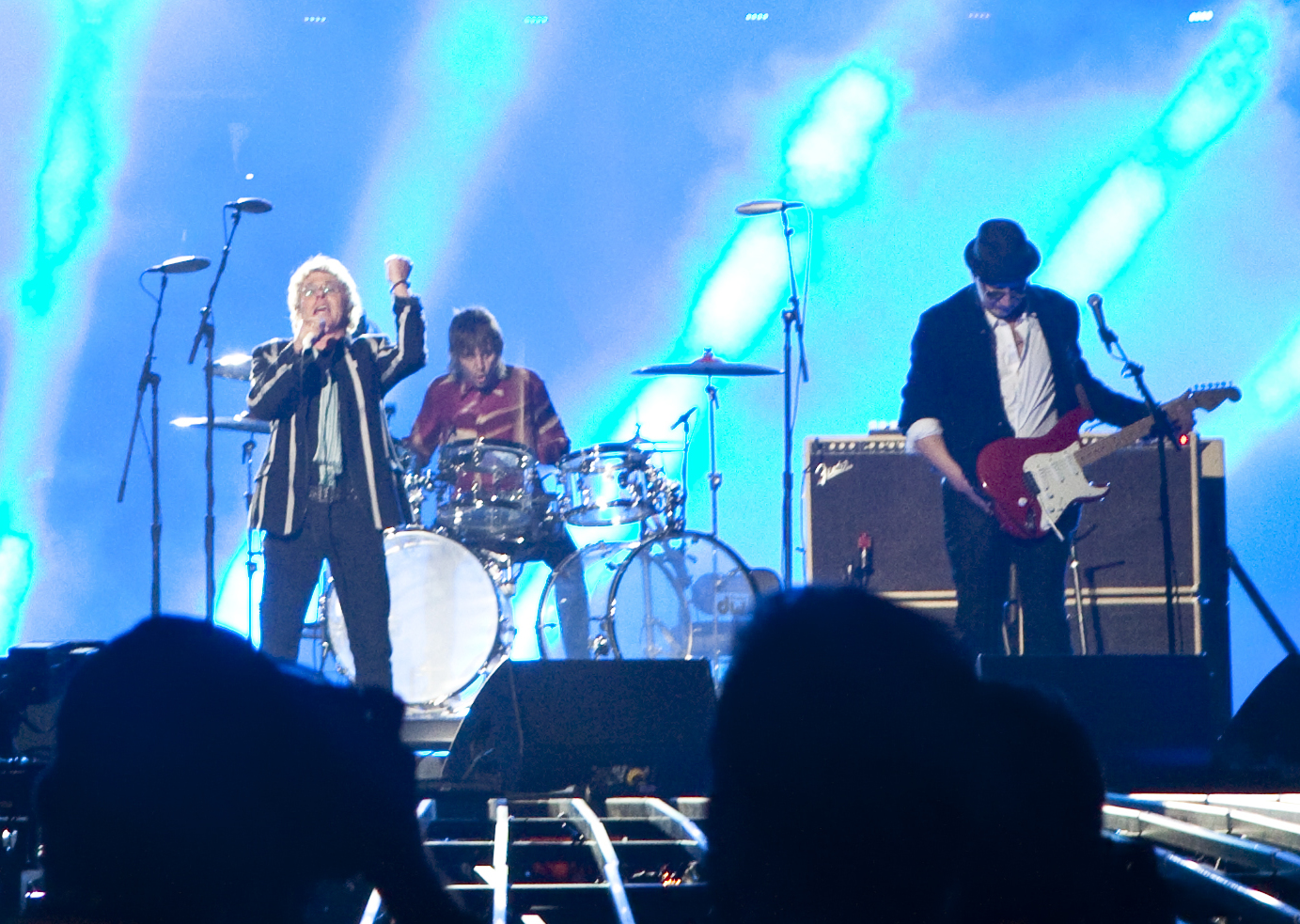
The Who during the Super Bowl XLIV halftime show

The Super Bowl XLIV halftime show took place on February 7, 2010, at Sun Life Stadium (now the Hard Rock Stadium) in Miami Gardens, Florida as part of Super Bowl XLIV. The show was headlined by English rock band The Who.

== Background ==
Following the heated controversy surrounding the Super Bowl XXXVIII halftime show headlined by Janet Jackson and Justin Timberlake in 2004, the NFL sought to avoid similar incidents by inviting legacy rock bands to headline the halftime show. The Who performed a farewell tour in 1982 and had not released new music since their 2006 album Endless Wire, but they were selected for their broad familiarity and appeal to audiences. The Who were the last such act to headline the annual show; the Black Eye Peas were chosen the following year to attract a younger demographic.

=== Health concerns ===
Frontman Roger Daltrey underwent surgery to remove a precancerous growth from his vocal cords in 2009. While the procedure was not publicized until 2011, it is now believed to have affected his vocal performance during the halftime show.

== Development ==
In conceiving the halftime show visuals, production designer Bruce Rodgers hoped to incorporate elements associated with the United States, the United Kingdom, and what he termed The Who's "visual vocabulary." The modular stage, consisting of a 26-piece main platform and 14 radial video modules surrounding this main platform as a shield, was built by Brian Sullivan of B+R Scenery. Graphics on these video screens were designed by Lee Lodge to coordinate with each number on band's 12-minute setlist. Lighting for the show was programmed at the PRG/Essential Lighting studio in London over a five-day period.

== Promotion ==
The Who were first announced as the Super Bowl XLIV headliners in November 2009. Weeks before the game, The Who guitarist Pete Townshend revealed the halftime show setlist in an exclusive interview with Billboard magazine. In February 2010, MTV Games and Harmonix announced that specially recorded versions of songs in the band's setlist would be available to download and play in the Rock Band video game after the Super Bowl broadcast.

== Setlist ==
- "Pinball Wizard"
- "Baba O'Riley"
- "Who Are You"
- "See Me, Feel Me"
- "Won't Get Fooled Again"

== Reception ==
=== Critical reception ===
In a review for The New York Times, critic Jon Pareles characterized The Who's rock anthems as well-suited for the stadium setting but noted the older age of the band members was apparent throughout.

The Super Bowl XLIV halftime show was nominated for Outstanding Production Design for a Variety or Reality Series at the 62nd Primetime Creative Arts Emmy Awards.

==== Retrospective appraisal ====
In 2023, Rolling Stone journalist Rob Sheffield ranked the Super Bowl XLIV halftime show as the 26th-best show out of 35 (all shows from 1967 and 1989 were ranked as a single entry). That same year, Brian Moylan of Vulture ranked the 2010 performance as the 24th-best halftime show since 1993.

=== Ratings ===
According to Nielsen Media Research, Super Bowl XLIV halftime show viewership was 4% lower than overall game viewership.

=== Media ===
Digital sales of the five songs featured in The Who's halftime show setlist increased 400% in the week after the Super Bowl.

== See also ==
- 2010 in American music
- 2010 in American television
