= Super Bowl XXXI halftime show =

Halftime show of the 1997 Super Bowl

- Part of: Super Bowl XXXI
- Date: January 26, 1997
- Location: New Orleans, Louisiana
- Venue: Louisiana Superdome
- Theme: Blues Brothers Bash
- Headliner: The Blues Brothers
- Special guests: James Brown and ZZ Top
- Sponsor: Oscar Mayer
- Producer: Select Productions, Radio City, and House of Blues

Super Bowl halftime show chronology
XXX (1996)	XXXI (1997)	XXXII (1998)

The Super Bowl XXXI halftime show took place on January 26, 1997 at the Louisiana Superdome in New Orleans, Louisiana. The show was titled "Blues Brothers Bash" and featured actors Dan Aykroyd, John Goodman, and Jim Belushi as the Blues Brothers. The show highlighted blues music and also had performances by the rock band ZZ Top and singer James Brown.

== Background and development ==
The show's producers were Select Productions, Radio City, and House of Blues.

The show's sponsor was Oscar Mayer.

While practicing for the show, stuntwoman Laura "Dinky" Patterson, one of a 16-member professional bungee jumping team, jumped from the 152-foot high temporary show truss hung from the roof. She collided head-first with the concrete floor, killing her instantly. The New York Times reported on January 29, 1997 that Patterson had been working with bungee cords that were being handled by volunteers who had received little training. The bungee-jumping portion of the halftime show was removed. A title-graphic commemorating Patterson and acknowledging her death was displayed during the TV broadcast of the Super Bowl.

The inclusion of a segment featuring Fox News Channel personality Catherine Crier was seen as an attempt for Fox, broadcasting their first-ever Super Bowl, to give their news channel free publicity.

The show was intended to create hype for the then-upcoming film Blues Brothers 2000.

Since the original Blues Brother John Belushi had died fifteen years prior, the remaining member Dan Aykroyd performed instead with Jim Belushi and John Goodman.

== Synopsis ==
The show began with a fictional Fox News bulletin presented by Catherine Crier, announcing that Aykroyd's Blues Brothers character Elwood J. Blues had escaped the Joliet State Prison.

The Blues Brothers then performed the songs "Everybody Needs Somebody to Love" and "Soul Man".

James Brown, wearing a pink satin suit, then performed his songs "I Got You (I Feel Good)" and "Get Up (I Feel Like Being a) Sex Machine".

ZZ Top then appeared, with their Eliminator car and people entering on motorcycles, and performed their songs "Tush" and "Legs".

All the performers ended the show by performing "Gimme Some Lovin'" together.

== Reception ==
Steve Johnson of the Chicago Tribune heavily criticized the show, particularly the Blues Brothers, likening the inclusion of ZZ Top and James Brown to placing prime roast beef "between moldy white bread". He also argued that the Blues Brothers were only chosen to act as "a stealth ad for the House of Blues chain of musical malls."

Many outlets have retrospectively ranked the show poorly among Super Bowl halftime shows. In 2019, Maeve McDermott of USA Today ranked the show as the second-most "disastrous" Super Bowl halftime show. Also in 2019, Roy Trakin and Jem Aswad of Variety ranked as one of the six "least memorable" Super Bowl halftime shows.

Conversely, in 2013, Dan Hyman of Rolling Stone retrospectively ranked the show as the eighth-best Super Bowl halftime show. In 2020, Aaron Tallent of Athlon Sports ranked the show well, writing, "This performance epitomizes what a Super Bowl halftime show should be: big and fun, but not overdone and torturous to watch." In 2020, Daniel Tran of Yardbarker also ranked the performance well.

== Setlist ==
- "Everybody Needs Somebody to Love" (The Blues Brothers)
- "Soul Man" (The Blues Brothers)
- "I Got You (I Feel Good)" (James Brown)
- "Get Up (I Feel Like Being a) Sex Machine" (James Brown)
- "Tush" (ZZ Top)
- "Legs" (ZZ Top)
- "Gimme Some Lovin'" (The Blues Brothers, James Brown, ZZ Top)

== Controversy ==
Some criticized the decision to have a faux news bulletin, which some may have mistaken as real. The segment was criticized as undermining the upstart Fox News Channel's journalistic integrity, as well as Crier's own.
