= Super Bowl XXVII halftime show =

Halftime show of 1993 Super Bowl

- Date: January 31, 1993
- Location: Pasadena, California
- Venue: Rose Bowl
- Headliner: Michael Jackson
- Sponsor: Frito-Lay
- Producer: Radio City Productions, Scott Sanders, Don Mischer Productions

Super Bowl halftime show chronology
XXVI (1992)	XXVII (1993)	XXVIII (1994)

The Super Bowl XXVII halftime show took place on January 31, 1993, at the Rose Bowl in Pasadena, California, as part of Super Bowl XXVII. The show was televised nationally in the U.S. by NBC.

In an effort to increase its profile after being counterprogrammed by an In Living Color special the previous year, the show featured a performance by Michael Jackson. The performance was successful in its goals, causing viewership of the Super Bowl to increase between halves for the first time in the game's history, with an audience of 133.4 million viewers in the United States. It is the most viewed half-time performance in the United States before Nielsen started to include out-of-home viewers in their totals in 2020; Kendrick Lamar's performance during the Super Bowl LIX halftime show in 2025 had 133.5 million viewers counted domestically, including out-of-home viewers in 48 states. The show, along with other notable appearances by Jackson in late January and February, also helped improve sales of his then current album Dangerous. In 1993, Guinness World Records named the broadcast the most-watched television event of all time in the United States.

Retrospectively, the show has been credited with establishing the norms of future Super Bowl halftime shows (with a greater focus on major names in popular music), and ranked as being among the greatest Super Bowl halftime shows of all time.

== Background ==
Prior to Super Bowl XXVII, the game's halftime show often featured performances by marching bands, and later drill teams and ensembles such as Up with People—acts that, by the 1990s, were considered to be culturally outdated. The previous year's halftime show had featured a salute to the 1992 Winter Olympics, with figure skating performances by Brian Boitano and Dorothy Hamill, and musical guest Gloria Estefan. Future NFL broadcaster Fox famously aired a special episode of its sketch comedy series In Living Color against the halftime period, which caused viewership of the game on CBS to decrease by 22%.

In the wake of the incident, the NFL began the process of heightening the profile of the halftime show in an effort to attract and retain mainstream viewers. Radio City Productions, who would produce the halftime show, attempted to court Michael Jackson by meeting with him and his manager Sandy Gallin. After three failed negotiations, including asking the NFL for a fee of $1 million, Jackson's management agreed to allow him to perform at Super Bowl XXVII.

Although the league does not pay appearance fees for Super Bowl halftime performers, the NFL and Frito-Lay agreed to make a donation of $100,000 to Jackson's Heal the World Foundation, and provide commercial time during the game for the foundation's Heal L.A. campaign, which aimed to provide health care, drug education, and mentorship for Los Angeles youth in the aftermath of the 1992 Los Angeles riots.

More than 250 volunteers were required in order to erect and disassemble the show's 10-ton stage. The stage was on all-terrain tires in order to limit damage to the playing surface.

== Performance ==
The show was staged and choreographed by Vincent Paterson. The performance began with James Earl Jones' voice introducing an, "unprecedented Super Bowl spectacular starring Michael Jackson". Jackson then seemed to appear at the top of the stadium's two jumbotrons (using body doubles). He then catapulted from center stage and stood completely frozen and silent for almost two minutes before his long-time guitarist Jennifer Batten began the performance. Jackson's performance included a medley consisting of "Jam" (with the beginning of "Why You Wanna Trip On Me"), "Billie Jean" and "Black or White" (includes beginning of "Another Part of Me") including the ending of Batten's guitar solo. The finale featured an audience card stunt, a video montage showing Jackson participating in various humanitarian efforts around the world, and a choir of over 3,000 local Los Angeles area children singing "We Are the World", later joining Jackson as he sang his single "Heal the World" with an inflatable globe. The globe resembled the single's cover art.

== Commercial reception ==
The halftime show was a major success, marking the first time in Super Bowl history that ratings increased between halves during the game. Super Bowl 1993 drew a national rating of 45.1 and a 66 share, up by 12% in comparation by the previous year and was the most watched game in six years. However, NBC Sports president at the time, Dick Ebersol, stated that the record-high numbers were largely due to the half-time show, which gave a 45.5 rating during the half hour from 8 to 8:30 p.m. EST. In comparison, the previous year game had a 40.3 rating and 61 share.

On the heels of his appearance at the 1993 American Music Awards, Jackson's 1991 album Dangerous saw a 83% increase in sales, moving 21,000 copies in the United States in the week following the Super Bowl. Sales increased further after the airing of a Michael Jackson interview special with Oprah Winfrey on February 10, and at the 35th Grammy Awards (accepting the Grammy Legend Award), causing Dangerous to reach the top 10 of the Billboard 200 and surpass 5 million in total sales.

== Critical reception ==
The Associated Press described the show as "flashy".

Jackson's halftime performance has regularly been retrospectively ranked among the best halftime performances of all time. In his Thrillist-published ranking of halftime shows (which as of its 2022 update, ranks Jackson's performance as the third-greatest halftime show up through that year's) opined,

“The King of Pop was the only interesting part of this blowout Super Bowl, and as mentioned earlier, helped turn the halftime show into the Holy Grail gig it is today. He made the halftime show America's preeminent platform for reaching the masses, and his natural sense of spectacle was perfect for American football, as exemplified by his insane leap up from a trapdoor in the stage. That long stare, the aviators, the moonwalk—it's easy to forget now why the king was king, but this...should remind you.”

In his Rolling Stone ranking of Super Bowl halftime shows, Rob Sheffield (in which he ranked Jackson's halftime show the 14th-best halftime show up through 2022) dubbed the performance the last great television performance of Jackson's lifetime.

In a 2022 article, Brian Moylan of Vulture, ranking the performance the tenth-best Super Bowl halftime show up through that year's, credited Jackson's show with turning Super Bowl halftime shows into "must-watch television". However, Moylan also opined,

"Just because you’re the first doesn’t mean you do it best. For starters, the networks hadn’t quite figured out how to broadcast a halftime show yet. It’s hard to hear the music over all of the cheering (which lasted a full three minutes before a note was even played), there was a commercial break in the middle of the program, and the game was in California, so it wasn’t quite dark out. Also, the production is painfully sincere in that way Michael Jackson loved: Instead of reaching into his packed back catalogue, he performed “We Are the World” with a children’s choir, then did “Heal the World” while an enormous globe inflated in the middle of the stage. Sure, he also did “Billie Jean” and moonwalked, but for a consummate showman, Michael Jackson could have done more."

== Set list ==
The following songs were performed during the halftime show:

- "Jam" (includes the beginning of "Why You Wanna Trip On Me")
- "Billie Jean"
- "Black or White" (includes the beginning of "Another Part of Me")
- "We Are the World" (children's choir)
- "Heal the World"

The performance of Heal the World appeared on the VHS Dangerous: The Short Films.
