= Kahlil Ashanti =

American actor and writer

- Born: November 3, 1973 (age 51); Landstuhl, Germany
- Occupation(s): actor, writer

Kahlil Ashanti (born November 3, 1973, in Landstuhl, Germany) is an American actor and writer.

Kahlil Ashanti began his career as a teenager, performing at a community theater and at open mic nights at comedy clubs throughout the Midwestern United States. He then enlisted in the United States Air Force, winning the 1993 Air Force Worldwide Talent Contest, after which he toured with the elite Air Force Entertainment troupe Tops in Blue in 1994 and 1995 as a comedian, dancer, and actor. After being honorably discharged in 1996, Kahlil performed his own magic and comedy dinner theater show at Caesar's Magical Empire, Caesar's Palace in Las Vegas from 1997–2000. Upon his arrival in Los Angeles in 2001, he began writing his one man show, Basic Training, which premiered at the 2nd Stage Theater in October 2004 and played Off-Broadway at the Barrow Street Theater in the fall of 2008.

In 2017, Khalil began playing a supporting role as Goat in the Amazon remake of The Tick.

== Awards and nominations ==
- Montreal English Critics Circle Award – Best Visiting Production
- NAACP Image Award (for 'Basic Training' Los Angeles Director Nick DeGruccio)
- Montreal Fringe – Best Production
- Vancouver Fringe Festival – Best Production
- Melbourne Fringe – Best Male Performance
- Scotsman Fringe First Award For Excellence in Writing And Performance
- Edinburgh Fringe Sell Out Show 2005, 2007
- New York Times Critics Pick
