= Super Bowl XXXV halftime show =

Halftime show of the 2001 Super Bowl

- Part of: Super Bowl XXXV
- Date: January 28, 2001
- Location: Tampa, Florida, United States
- Venue: Raymond James Stadium
- Headliner: Aerosmith and NSYNC
- Special guests: Mary J. Blige; Nelly; Britney Spears; Tremors featuring The Earthquake Horns
- Sponsor: E-Trade
- Producer: MTV

Super Bowl halftime show chronology
XXXIV (2000)	XXXV (2001)	XXXVI (2002)

The Super Bowl XXXV halftime show, titled "The Kings of Rock and Pop" took place on January 28, 2001 at the Raymond James Stadium in Tampa, Florida, as part of Super Bowl XXXV. It was headlined by Aerosmith and NSYNC, and also featured appearances by Mary J. Blige, Britney Spears, Nelly, Tremors, and The Earthquake Horns.

== Production ==
The show was produced by MTV, then a sister network of CBS, which was the broadcaster of Super Bowl XXXV.

The show was sponsored by E-Trade.

At the time of the show, Aerosmith was promoting the upcoming release of their album Just Push Play.

Notably, this halftime show was the first to feature fans standing on the field around the stage.

== Summary ==
The show featured a back-and-forth medley between Aerosmith and NSYNC.

The performance was preceded by a prerecorded skit featuring Ben Stiller, Adam Sandler, and Chris Rock with Aerosmith and NSYNC.

The show began with NSYNC performing "Bye Bye Bye" followed by Aerosmith's rendition of "I Don't Want to Miss a Thing".

Next, NSYNC, joined by Tremors and The Earthquake Horns, performed "It's Gonna Be Me". At the end of the song, Aerosmith front-man Steven Tyler sang a final line ("It's gonna be me"), before Aerosmith performed "Jaded".

The show ended with NSYNC and Aerosmith uniting to perform the latter's song "Walk This Way", joined by Britney Spears, Nelly (who rapped part of "E.I."), and Mary J. Blige.

== Setlist ==
- Pre-recorded intro sketch with Ben Stiller, Adam Sandler, Chris Rock, Aerosmith, and NSYNC
- "Bye Bye Bye" (NSYNC)
- "I Don't Want to Miss a Thing" (Aerosmith)
- "It's Gonna Be Me" (NSYNC and Tremors featuring The Earthquake Horns)
- "Jaded" (Aerosmith)
- "Walk This Way" (Aerosmith, NSYNC, Britney Spears, Mary J. Blige, Nelly (contains elements of "E.I.")

== Reception ==
=== Critical ===
Some outlets have, retrospectively, ranked it as among the best Super Bowl halftime shows.

=== Commercial ===
Artists featured saw an increase in sales following the performance. NSYNC's latest album, No Strings Attached, saw a 23% increase in sales in the week following the performance. Britney Spears' album Oops!... I Did It Again saw a 4% increase in sales in the week after the performance. Nelly's latest album Country Grammar saw a 26% increase in sales in the week after the performance.
