= Super Bowl XLV halftime show =

2011 show headlined by The Black Eyed Peas

- Part of: Super Bowl XLV
- Date: February 6, 2011
- Location: Arlington, Texas
- Venue: AT&T Stadium
- Headliner: The Black Eyed Peas
- Special guests: Slash; Usher
- Sponsors: Bridgestone
- Directors: Hamish Hamilton
- Producers: Ricky Kirshner

Super Bowl halftime show chronology
XLIV (2010)	XLV (2011)	XLVI (2012)

The Super Bowl XLV halftime show took place on February 6, 2011, at AT&T Stadium in Arlington, Texas as part of Super Bowl XLV. The Black Eyed Peas headlined and performed a medley of their songs, with Slash and Usher making guest appearances. They intended to bring youth back into the halftime show. The show received negative reviews from critics, who derided the group's performance; however, its visuals and Usher's appearance earned some praise.

== Background ==
A country music halftime show was originally in the planning stages before the Black Eyed Peas agreed to perform. After months of speculation, the selection of the Black Eyed Peas was announced on November 25, 2010. The choice of the Black Eyed Peas was intended to bring youth back into the halftime show, after the NFL had booked legacy artists in the years following the Super Bowl XXXVIII halftime show and its controversy.

== Development ==
The show also displayed a long list of other performers, including Prairie View A&M University's "Marching Storm" Band. The performance experienced some audio issues.

=== Fashion ===
Members of the Black Eyed Peas each wore outfits that were unique from one another's. However, they coordinated elements of each outfit's overall look, with each having a futuristic black-colored outfit.

Fergie wore a light-emitting diode (LED)-embedded costume designed by Anouk Wipprecht and B. Akerlund. Her shoes, on which Wipprecht collaborated with Dutch shoemaker Rene van den Berg, were integrated with Luminex, a light-emitting synthetic fiber. The outfit had a leather skirt and a belt studded with many Swarovski crystals. A football-inspired chest-piece design with flashing LEDs was engineered by Tom Talmon for the outfit.

Taboo's outfit featured a digital chest plate that switched images to match what song was being performed, for instance, displaying a red heart shape during the performance of "Where Is the Love?". will.i.am's outfit was accessorized with a transparent skullcap. During his guest appearance, Slash wore a top hat, a signature look of his. The top hat he wore was sequined.

The show's sizable group of dancers wore LED costumes which could be illuminated various colors. Some in the media likened the visual effect of the illuminated dancers to the visuals of the Tron franchise.

== Synopsis ==
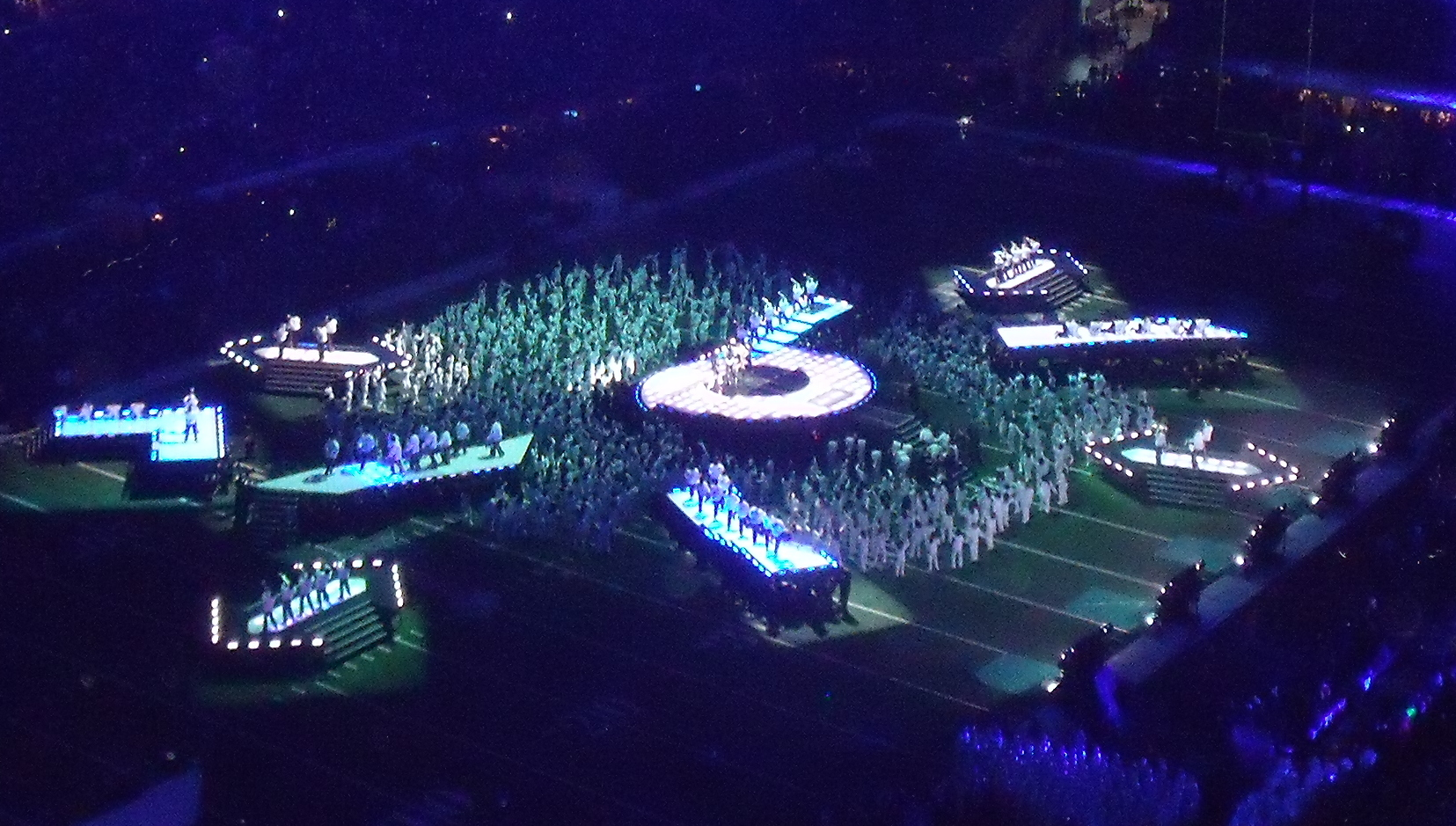
Halftime show

The show began with the four members of the Black Eyed Peas (will.i.am, Fergie, apl.de.ap, and Taboo) descending via cables onto the stage. The Black Eyed Peas started their performance with "I Gotta Feeling". The Black Eyed Peas then began their second song, "Boom Boom Pow". Dancers in glowing costumes arranged themselves on the field into shape formations such as arrows and a giant eye. During the performance of "Boom Boom Pow", the dancers costumes were illuminated in green. "Boom Boom Pow" transitioned into "Sweet Child o' Mine", with the two songs briefly overlapping. Slash then rose onto the stage, with Will.i.am. introducing him, "Ladies and gentlemen, the one and only Slash." Fergie then joined Slash, singing the lyrics to "Sweet Child o' Mine". For the performance of "Sweet Child o' Mine", the dancers' costumes were illuminated in red. This was followed by renditions of "Pump It" and "Let's Get It Started". Usher then descended onto the stage in a manner similar to how The Black Eyed Peas had originally entered. He performed "OMG" with will.i.am.

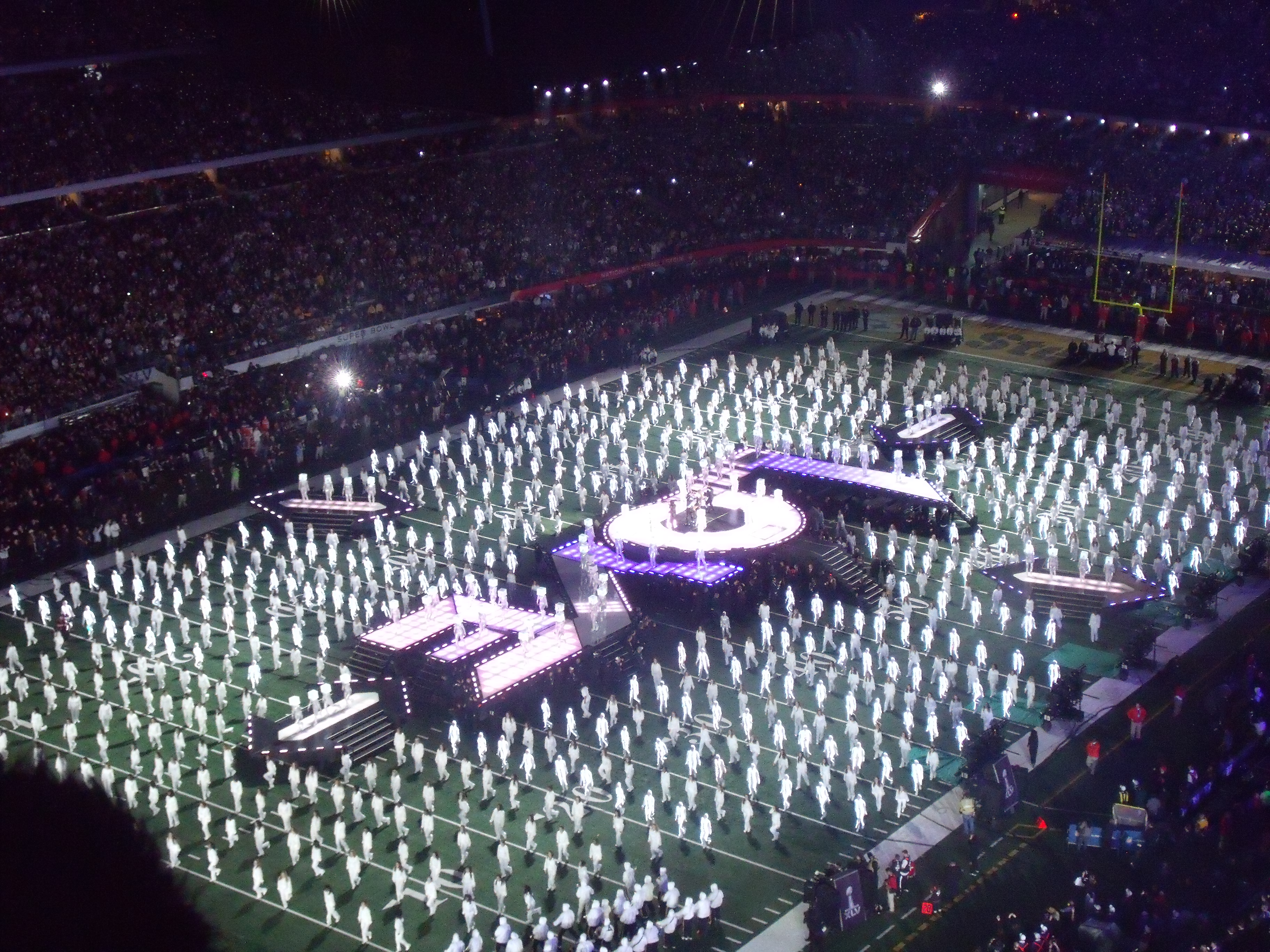
Stage arranged to spell the word "love"

The stage, which consisted of several moving platforms and was illuminated by many lights, was then rearranged to spell the word "love". Fergie declared, "Super Bowl XLV, show us some love," before The Black Eyed Peas launch into the song "Where Is the Love?". The performance then ended with the song "The Time (Dirty Bit)" and a reprise of "I Gotta Feeling".

== Critical reception ==
The performance received negative reviews from critics, and mixed to negative reviews from audiences and fans. A national viewer poll conducted by ESPN found that 35% (a plurality) of respondents graded the performance an "F". Celebrities and musicians such as Justin Bieber, Seth MacFarlane, and Kim Kardashian reacted more positively. Taboo responded to the negative reviews and comments, and cited technical issues and overwhelming visuals as possible factors.

Billboard was critical of Fergie's vocal performance, tweeting: "gotta love Fergie Ferg, but her voice sounded a little strained. Will.i.am was futuristic swagger but Stacy stumbled a bit." Vince Cestone of Bleacher Report called the performance "uninspiring," and wrote that "The Black Eyed Peas were pathetic—or mediocre at best." However, he praised the visual effects of the performance as "impressive." JP Starkey of SB Nation Dallas wrote, "It wasn't entertaining, it wasn't fun, the songs were brutally bad and didn't translate to a live setting whatsoever." Paul Cashmere of Undercover.fm called the performance "hideous." Nekesa Mumbi Moody of the Associated Press declared, "The Black Eyed Peas brought the youth, but little else," but praised Usher's part of the performance as a "brief exhilarating moment." Ben Werner of the Orange County Register called the performance a "glittering bore."

When reviewing the Super Bowl XLVII halftime show in 2013, the Associated Press' Mesfin Fekadu retrospectively called the Black Eyed Peas' performance "disastrous." In 2019, Maeve McDermott of USA Today retrospectively ranked the show as the fifth "most disastrous" Super Bowl halftime show, writing, "The Black Eyed Peas revealed themselves to be a woefully inadequate live act for the halftime show." In 2020, Rob Sheffield of Rolling Stone ranked the performance as the worst-ever Super Bowl halftime show. In 2021, Patrick Ryan of USA Today wrote that it ranks among the worst halftime shows of the 2010s, calling it a "futuristic eyesore".

== Setlist ==
- "I Gotta Feeling" (The Black Eyed Peas)
- "Boom Boom Pow" (The Black Eyed Peas)
- "Sweet Child O' Mine" with "Slither" guitar solo (Slash and Fergie)
- "Pump It" (The Black Eyed Peas)
- "Let's Get It Started" (The Black Eyed Peas)
- "OMG" (Usher and will.i.am)
- "Where Is the Love?" (The Black Eyed Peas)
- "The Time (Dirty Bit)" with "I Gotta Feeling" reprise (The Black Eyed Peas)

Source: Billboard/Associated Press
