= Super Bowl XXXIII halftime show =

- Part of: Super Bowl XXXIII
- Date: January 31, 1999
- Location: Miami, Florida
- Venue: Pro Player Stadium
- Theme: "A Celebration of Soul, Salsa and Swing"
- Headliner: Gloria Estefan; Stevie Wonder
- Special guests: Big Bad Voodoo Daddy
- Sponsor: Progressive Auto Insurance
- Producer: Radio City Productions

Super Bowl halftime show chronology
XXXII (1998)	XXXIII (1999)	XXXIV (2000)

The Super Bowl XXXIII halftime show was a performance that took place at the halftime of Super Bowl XXXIII.

The show was titled "A Celebration of Soul, Salsa and Swing" and featured Big Bad Voodoo Daddy, Stevie Wonder, and Gloria Estefan.

== Production ==
A native to the Super Bowl host city of Miami, Estefan had previously performed as a solo artist at the halftime show for Super Bowl XXVI and as a member of the Miami Sound Machine in the halftime show for Super Bowl XXIX.

The halftime show was sponsored by Progressive Auto Insurance. Progressive, in doing so, was the first auto insurer to be the title sponsor of a Super Bowl halftime show. The show was produced by Radio City Productions. The show featured 1,000 performers. Effects included large lighted balloon balls, lasers, pyrotechnics.

The show took place around the time of the end of commercial success of the swing revival. Music journalist Rob Sheffield has likened it to marking an end of 1990s music culture in the same that many regard the Altamont Free Concert as marking an end of the 1960s youth culture, remarking, "in a way, this halftime show did for the '90s what Altamont did for the '60s".

== Synopsis ==
The show was preceded with a brief skit featuring Estefan and Wonder with the character E.T. the Extra-Terrestrial, who had appeared in Super Bowl advertisements run that night for the show's title sponsor Progressive Auto Insurance.

The performance began with Big Bad Voodoo Daddy performing "Go Daddy-O".

Wonder then entered the field in a vintage automobile, while performing "Sir Duke". He sat at a keyboard and performed "You Are the Sunshine of My Life". During this song, dancers unrolled large swaths of cloth to form an image of a sun on the field. He then performed "I Wish", during which he was joined on stage by tap dancer Savion Glover. Wonder briefly joined Savion in tap dancing.

The performance then saw Miami native Estefan make her entrance. She sang "Oye!" followed by "Turn the Beat Around". During "Turn the Beat Around", dancers on the field swung long lighted ropes.

The performance ended with Wonder and Estefan both performing "You'll Be Mine (Party Time)". During this final song, Wonder wore a jacket with the word "African" on one sleeve and the word "American" on the other.
