= Walt Disney World Millennium Celebration =

Previous event at Walt Disney World

Millennium Celebration
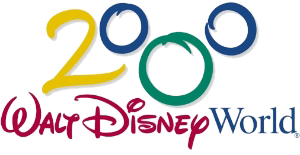
- Walt Disney World Millennium Celebration logo
- Dates: October 1, 1999 – January 1, 2001
- Location: Walt Disney World
- Organizer: Walt Disney World

The Walt Disney World Millennium Celebration was an event at the Walt Disney World Resort as part of millennium celebrations held around the world. Running from October 1, 1999, to January 1, 2001, the celebration was primarily based at Epcot, with its emphasis on human potential and the possibilities of the future.

The Celebration spawned many changes for Epcot. In 1999, a large wand was erected next to Spaceship Earth with "2000" written on it. Also, a new fireworks show was created for the World Showcase Lagoon called "IllumiNations 2000: Reflections of Earth." A parade located in Epcot called "Tapestry of Nations" was also created for the celebration, which would also become the inspiration for the Disney-produced Super Bowl XXXIV halftime show, which promoted the Millennium Celebration.

"Celebrate the Future Hand in Hand" was the theme song of the celebration, and was released on the 1999 Walt Disney World official album. The Walt Disney World Millennium Celebration album also contained this song as well as the soundtracks to the fireworks show and the parade. This CD was also available in a slightly different form on the Walt Disney World: Yearlong Millennium Celebration album, a promotional CD available to purchasers of Energizer batteries.

== Millennium Dreamers Global Children's Summit ==
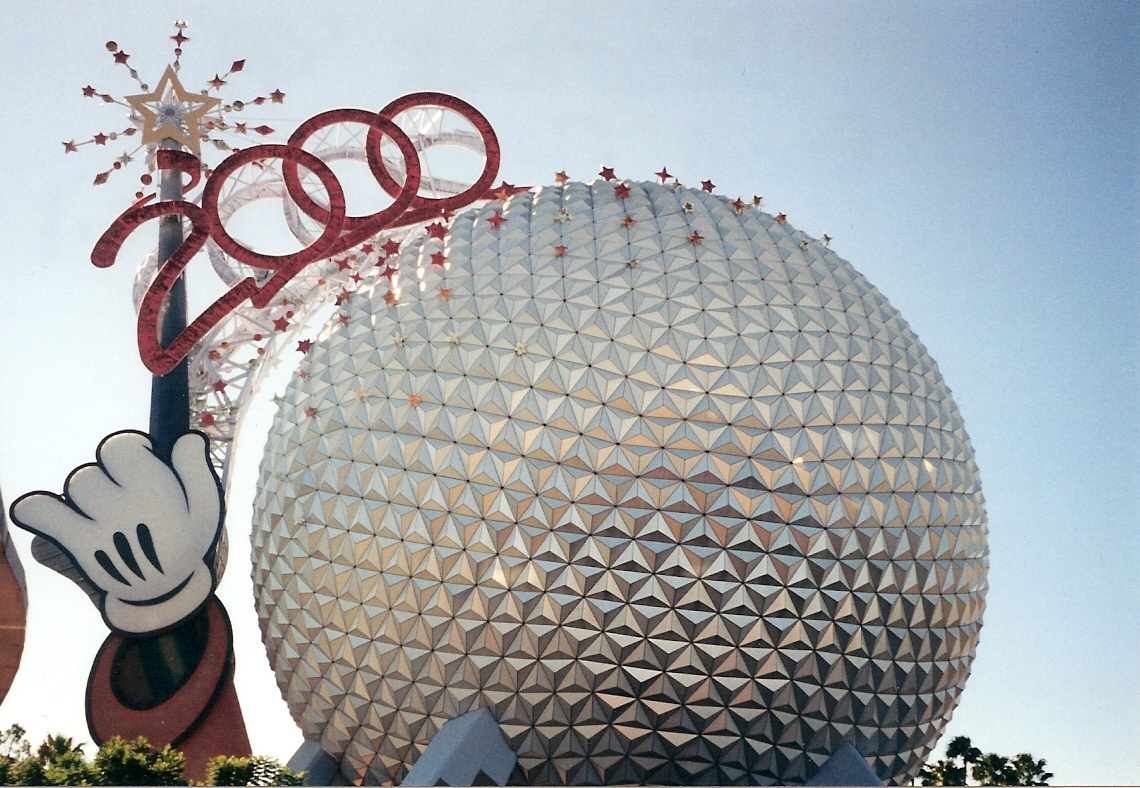
The celebration was primarily based in Epcot. A modification of a wand with the year 2000 was made to Spaceship Earth.

One of the events that took place during the celebration was The Millennium Dreamers global children's summit, sponsored by McDonald's and UNESCO. It was an event that took place during the first week of May 2000. Two thousand children and teenagers selected for their volunteerism and philanthropy in the USA, and others from more than 198 countries around the world, came to Epcot and the other parks for workshops, symposiums, behind-the-scenes tours, and private functions that allowed them to network and learn about different cultures and customs from their peers.

== Millennium Village ==
A pavilion in Epcot was constructed and opened on October 1, 1999, specifically for the Millennium Celebration called "Millennium Village." Millennium Village was a 60,000-square-foot building that contained many exhibits featuring countries that were not represented at the World Showcase, along with exhibits featuring the United Nations/World Bank and an exhibit relating to EXPO 2000. The pavilion closed at the end of the celebration on January 1, 2001. At the completion of the Millennium Celebration, Millennium Village was renamed World ShowPlace Pavilion.

== Legacy ==
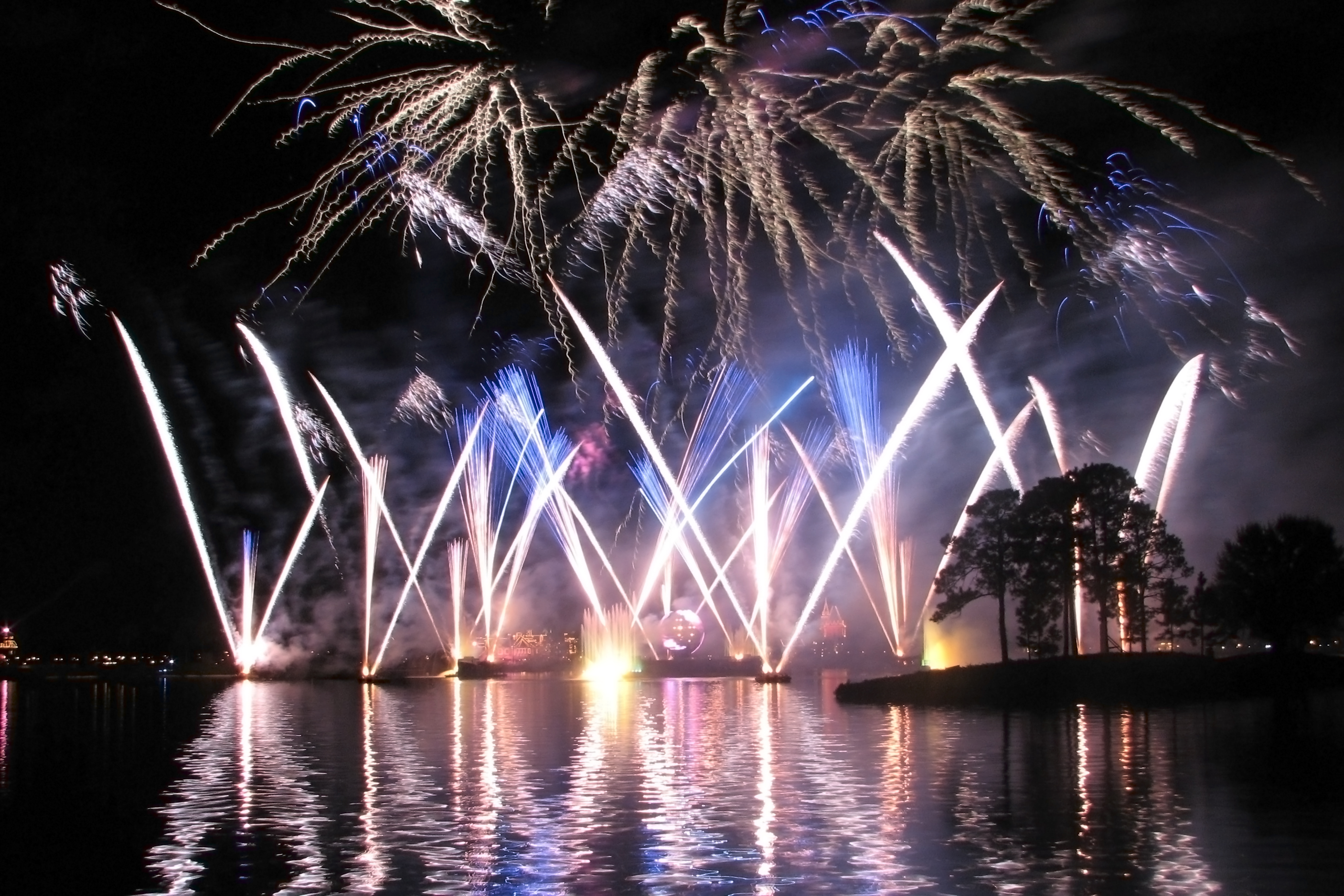
Illuminations played at Epcot until September 30, 2019

The text on the large "Mickey Wand" constructed next to Spaceship Earth was changed from "2000" to "Epcot" in 2001, and remained in place for many years until late 2007 when it began being dismantled in honor of Epcot's 25th anniversary. In May 2019, the large "Leave a Legacy" structures in front of Spaceship Earth facing the main gate began the process of being moved to a location outside of the main entrance to accommodate an updated Epcot entrance plan, with the west half of the structures being removed in June 2019. Millennium Village was later repurposed as the "World Showplace Pavilion." IllumiNations 2000: Reflections of Earth was so successful it continued to operate at Epcot as "IllumiNations: Reflections of Earth" for 20 years, until September 30, 2019. IllumiNations has won several awards in the years since such as 2012's Best Outdoor Night Production Show by The Golden Ticket Awards.

The Millennium Celebration also marked the start to Official Disney Pin Trading in Walt Disney World and Disneyland, with Tokyo Disneyland and Disneyland Paris soon following.

== See also ==
- Epcot attraction and entertainment history
