= Up with People =

American nonprofit organization

- Up with People logo
- Founded: July 23, 1968 (56 years ago)
- Type: Educational, cultural, civic
- Tax ID no.: 95-2563102
- Legal status: 501(c)(3) nonprofit organization
- Headquarters: Denver, Colorado, U.S.
- President and Chief Executive Officer: Seema Srivastava
- Website: upwithpeople.org

Up with People (UWP) is an American 501(c)(3) nonprofit organization. Up with People staged song and dance performances promoting themes such as multiculturalism, racial equality, and positive thinking.

== History ==
=== Founding ===
UWP was born out of a split from Moral Re-Armament, a multifaith religious movement. In 1965, J. Blanton Belk dedicated his energies to creating an organization for young adults that enabled them to interact with the world through positivity and music. He created Up with People (UWP) to bring people together for the common good regardless of ideology, political affiliation, ethnicity, race, or religious affiliation. Up with People was officially incorporated as a "501(c)(3) nonprofit, apolitical, non-sectarian international educational organization" in 1968 under the leadership of Belk.

=== 1970s - 1990s ===
UWP traveled and performed their musical show across several countries. Notable events were performances at the Indianapolis 500, the Cotton Bowl, the White House, Super Bowl X, and the People's Republic of China. In the 1980s UWP continued their musical tour, performing at Super Bowls XIV, XVI, and XX. They performed at the 1982 World's Fair, the Jerash Festival, the Macy's Thanksgiving Day Parade, U.S. President George H. W. Bush’s inauguration in Washington, D.C., and Berlin to celebrate the fall of the Berlin Wall. UWP toured throughout the 1990s, performing at events at the Washington Monument, the Freedom Festival in Philadelphia, the United Nations Conference on Environment and Development's Earth Summit, and the first Celebration of Peace event with Colin Powell in Denver, Colorado. Companies like Exxon, Halliburton, Coca-Cola, Pfizer, General Electric, Coors, Toyota, Enron and Searle donated tens of millions of dollars to the organization. When that support started to fade, it began to charge tuition to members—$2,400 in 1972, and $5,300 in 1982 (about $18,000 adjusted for inflation to 2025). By the 1990s, the organization found itself struggling to recruit youth capable of paying tuition rates that exceeded the cost of most private universities, a problem compounded by the mostly indifferent response to the group's public performance.

=== 2000s - 2024 ===
UWP suspended touring operations from 2000 until 2004. The program was rebranded with a more academic focus on the benefits of travel, volunteer service, performing arts, and leadership development with the sub-brand Worldsmart Leadership Program. Two years after its relaunch, the sub-brand was discontinued. Notable touring appearances during the 2000s were the Macy's Thanksgiving Day Parade, the United Nations Culture of Peace Forum at the UN Headquarters, the 400th Anniversary of Bermuda, and the 119th Tournament of Roses Parade in Pasadena, California. Notable performances during the 2010s were performing for Queen Silvia of Sweden at the Mentor Foundation Gala, Washington, DC; the 122nd Tournament of Roses Parade; and the 100th Anniversary of Kiwanis International in Indianapolis, Indiana. Former director Vernon C. Grigg III was hired as the president and CEO after the retirement of Dale Penny. Grigg was succeeded by Seema Srivastava as CEO in 2022.

== 2025–present: Up with People Foundation ==
In 2025, following the end of its touring cast model, Up with People launched the Up with People Foundation as a new phase of the organization. The Foundation shifted from operating international touring casts to supporting community-based projects and initiatives led by alumni and local leaders whose work aligns with the organization's mission.

The Foundation supports projects focused on music, community connection, service, cultural understanding, and youth development. Through grants, partnerships, and other forms of support, it works with initiatives around the world that reflect the mission and values historically associated with Up with People.

=== Archives ===
The UWP Archives are housed at the University of Arizona Special Collections library. The archives include materials from the Up with People organization, the International Alumni Association, as well as the personal papers of the UWP Founder and Chairman Emeritus J. Blanton Belk and his wife Elizabeth "Betty" Belk. Select materials from the UWP archives are accessible on the Up with People digital collection hosted on the University of Arizona Special Collections website.

=== Super Bowl performances ===
In the 1970s, Up with People began to make frequent appearances at the Super Bowl; the group performed in five Super Bowl halftime shows between 1976 and 1986. Only the Grambling State University Marching Band has performed more Super Bowl halftime shows, with a total of six appearances.

== Related and affiliated organizations ==
=== Up with People International Alumni Association ===
Up with People has an alumni group/professional networking organization that goes by the name: the Up with People International Alumni Association (UWPIAA). It was formed in 1988 and is also a 501(c)(3) nonprofit organization. The alumni body is composed of over 20,000 members from over 100 countries.

=== Common Beat ===
Common Beat is an organization started in Japan by South Korean Han Chu Son. Chu Son traveled as a student in Up with People, took the UWP show ‘A Common Beat’ to Japan, translated it, and performed it there.

== Criticism ==
By the 1990s, Up With People's themed, musical-style spectacles were frequently lambasted by critics and mocked by television writers for being dated and seeming phony, if not outright creepy. One critic opined, "Up With People didn't lose its way because it lost the ability to control its cast members' behavior, or because the public suddenly came to recognize that its sickly sweet songs were insufferable. Up With People declined because it became irrelevant, especially after the Cold War ended[.]" Its songs were criticized as naive and childlike, with titles like "You Can't Live Crooked And Think Straight" and "To Tell The Truth."

In 2009, the independent documentary film Smile 'Til It Hurts: The Up With People Story was produced by Lee Storey. The film covers history of the group, and contains archival footage and interviews with past UWP members. It is generally critical of the organization, with the filmmakers describing it as "what can happen when ideology, money and groupthink converge to co-opt youthful idealism." The documentary asserts that the organization, founded on conservative American ideals, was funded by corporate America and was deliberate propaganda to counteract the liberal counter-culture of the 1960s and 1970s.

== In popular culture ==
Music critics cite Up with People as a stylistic influence for R.E.M's tongue-in-cheek "Shiny Happy People" and the corresponding music video due to its over-the-top and colorful musical spectacle.

In two episodes of The Simpsons, "Bart vs. Thanksgiving" and "Selma's Choice", the show parodied the group as "Hooray for Everything," a group of "clean-cut young go-getters" that performs ridiculous songs such as a cover of "Get Dancin" dedicated as a "salute to the Western hemisphere, the dancingest hemisphere of all."

The TV show Cheers had a character, Loretta, who sang with the fictional group "The Grinning Americans" (a favorite group of another character, Cliff, and his mother).

The creators of The Book of Mormon, a musical that satirizes the Latter-Day Saint movement, cited Up with People as an inspiration for the cartoonishly joyous style of several of the songs in their musical performance, which sends up the clean-cut image of Mormon culture.

In the musical Ride the Cyclone, the character Ocean Rosenberg discovers an Up with People record in her left-of-center humanist parents' record collection at age 8 and starts her on her journey to become the most successful girl in town.

In the show Popular (episode "All About Adam" (S1E16)), the character Mary Cherry is threatened with exposure as a former Up with People castmember by new kid in school Adam.

== Notable alumni ==
Elizabeth Birch, attorney and former corporate executive who chaired the board of directors of the National Gay and Lesbian Task Force from 1992 to 1994 and served from 1995 until 2004 as the executive director of the Human Rights Campaign, the nation's largest LGBT organization, travelled one year with UWP in her high school years.

NBC News correspondent Tom Costello of The Today Show, NBC Nightly News, MSNBC, and CNBC traveled with Up with People. He is quoted as saying "For me, the gap year was a big year of growing up, and I changed profoundly."

Frank Gatson Jr. traveled with Up with People, and he is known for being the creative director for En Vogue, Brandy, Rihanna, Jennifer Lopez, and Beyoncé. He has also choreographed videos, routines and live performances for artists including Michael Jackson, TLC, Kelly Rowland, Fifth Harmony, Destiny's Child, Toni Braxton, and Usher.

Singer-songwriter Steve Poltz toured with Up with People as part of the band when he was 18; the song "Up With People" is on his 2022 album Stardust and Satellites.

Dutch musician Wijnand "Whynot" Jansveld, who has recorded and toured with artists like The Wallflowers, Richard Marx, Matchbox 20 and many more, travelled in his late teens in 1987. Belgian singer Amaryllis Temmerman traveled at the age of 18 in 1993. Swedish author Andreas Ekström traveled at the age of 17 in 1993. Canadian television drama director Anya Adams (known for Bridgerton among other productions) traveled in 1994.

Actress Glenn Close toured with Up With People with the original cast from 1965-68. She was part of the Green-Glenn singers and is featured on the first recorded album and first TV special of Up With People.

== Discography ==
- Up with People: The Sing Out Musical (1965)
- Up with People in Hollywood (1966)
- Up with People III (1967)
- Frontiers of Tomorrow (1968)
- Up with People (1969)
- Let All the People In (1970)
- The Further We Reach (1972)
- Livin' On (1973)
- The Show Album (1974)
- Push On Through (1976)
- People Are the Energy (1978)
- Encore (1980)
- Holiday Greetings (1980)
- Live in Concert (1982)
- Beat of the Future (1984)
- Time for the Music (1986)
- Face to Face (1988)
- Rhythm of the World (1990)
- World in Motion (1992)
- The Festival (1994)
- Roads (1997)
- A Common Beat (1999)
- Up with People World Tour (2008-2009)
- A Song for the World (2010)
- Voices (2012)
- The Journey (2015)
- Live on Tour 2018 (2018)
- Keep Hope Alive (Studio Recordings from Live on Tour) (2018)
