= Tapestry of Nations =

Parade at Epcot (1999–2001)

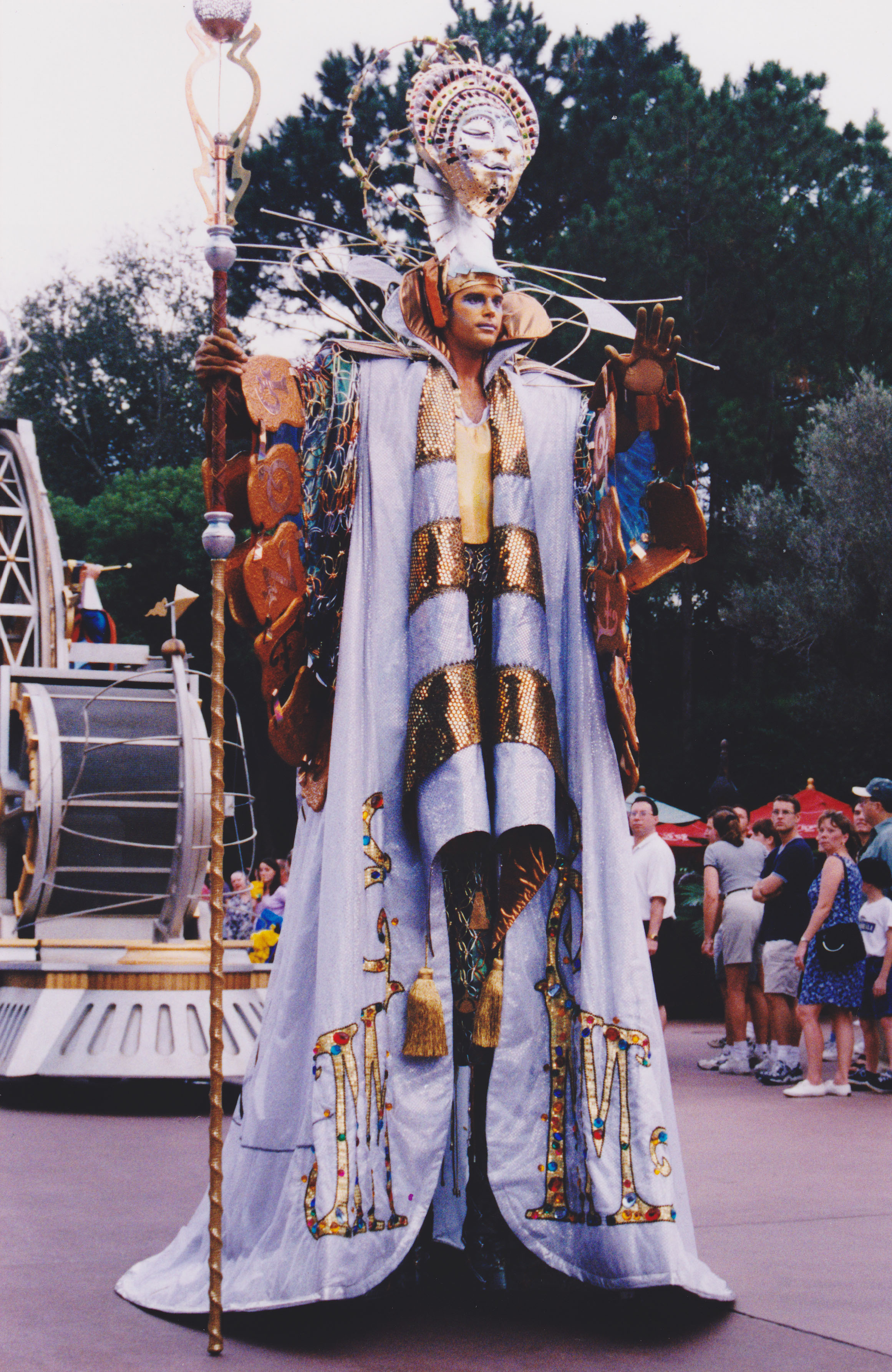
- The Sage of Time

Epcot
- Area: World Showcase
- Status: Closed
- Opening date: October 1, 1999
- Closing date: September 9, 2001

Ride statistics
- Attraction type: Parade
- Theme: Unity and World Peace
- Music: Gavin Greenaway
- Vehicles: Rolling Percussion Units
- Duration: 30 Minutes

The Tapestry of Nations was a parade at the Epcot theme park in Walt Disney World, Florida, United States, that ran around the World Showcase Lagoon from 1999 to 2001, after which it was rethemed as Tapestry of Dreams. The parade had a unity and world peace theme and featured a variety of large puppets and massive rotating drum units with drummers dressed like kings. The puppets were designed by Michael Curry who also designed the puppets for The Lion King on Broadway and a variety of Disney theme park shows. The leader of the parade was the Sage of Time (better known as the fabled Father Time), who was represented as a stilt walker in an elaborate costume featuring alchemy symbols, gold trim on a white robe (featuring the Roman numerals MM for 2000 at the bottom), a staff, and a headpiece resembling a sun with a face.

The Puppets included:

- Reverse Marionette, a large multicolored puppet with a little marionette being held in its arms.
- Disc Man, a large character with discs within the body and dreadlocks. This was the heaviest and tallest of all the puppets.
- Hammer Man, a humanoid character made of pieces of sheet metal.
- The Sprite, a winged character with a three tiered tail.
- Angel Girl, a feminine figure with a massive wingspan and human face.
- Wiggle Girl, similar to Angel Girl, but had a smaller wingspan and lacked a face, also had movement in the hips.
- Bird Man, with a large wingspan and a crane-like face. This puppet was the hardest to control.
- Aztec Man, with an Aztec-style head, small wingspan and several flaps at its end, similar to kite tails.

The parade (or a variant of this) was also the theme for the halftime show at Super Bowl XXXIV in 2000. Both the parade and the halftime show were directed by Gary Paben. Footage of the parade could still be seen on the Earth Globe in IllumiNations: Reflections of Earth through that show's closure in 2019.

== Tapestry of Dreams ==
In 2001, the parade became Tapestry of Dreams. Wishes from children around the world were heard throughout the parade's soundtrack. The middle of the parade had a tribute to Walt Disney, "...the greatest and most wonderful dreamer of all!" with Bill Rogers (the voice behind most of the announcements at Walt Disney World Resort) narrating. In this version, the Sage of Time was replaced with the Dreamseekers, a trio of elf-like humanoid characters that would open and close the parade and collect Dreamtale coins that children would receive at the Epcot Kidcot stations. These three included:

- Leonardo Columbus (voiced by Chris Truelson), who represented discovery, invention and genius.
- Elfin (voiced by Jodi Chase), who represented nature, magic and emotions.
- Cosmo (voiced by Scott Wayrock), who represented space and the unknown.

It ran nightly, although in a reduced fashion compared to Tapestry of Nations and was canceled in March 2003 as a result of degrading show elements over the course of the show's lifespan.

== Variations ==
Besides the Tapestry of Dreams version, there were three variations of Tapestry of Nations, each having differences in audio.

The original version, with only the ticking and chiming of clocks with narration from a more stoic Sage of Time being used, ran from the parade's debut in October 1999 to the middle of December 1999. Known as the Diversity Pass, this version included a parade lineup of repeating segments separated by floats, with each segment containing one of each style of puppet. This version was shown during the first performance each night (usually at 6:30 PM).

For the second nightly show (usually 8:10 PM), the introduction was changed with the addition of the legend of the Sage of Time and a re-recording of the Sage's voice to give him a more gentle tone. This pass was known as the Unity Pass, and grouped all of each style of puppets together in the parade lineup. Sometime in December 1999, this version became the standard, running twice nightly until the Millennium Celebration's conclusion in the spring of 2001.

After this, changes to the script brought in the theme of human dreams, which would carry on to the Tapestry of Dreams version, though still retaining the opening narration and the character of the Sage of Time. This version ran to the middle of the summer of 2001 when the Tapestry of Dreams version finally debuted.

Outside of Epcot, Tapestry of Nations served as the theme of the Super Bowl XXXIV halftime show and featured a massive sized Sage of Time as a backdrop in addition to an appearance by the parade's walkaround version.

== Soundtrack ==
The music for the parade was written by Gavin Greenaway, who was suggested to Disney by Hans Zimmer. Regarding the lyrics, Greenaway said:

The words are made up to sound like a language, as I didn’t want to have some people understanding and others not. So, this way, nobody understands the words! But I chose the sounds and syllables to sound like some sort of proto-language. Very simple vowels and limited consonants. Each listener can attach their own meaning.

The Millennium Heartbeat section, which was released on the Walt Disney World Millennium Celebration CD track, was not featured in the parade, as it lasted about a minute and a half, and was substituted by a different transition section which lasted about 50 seconds and still heavily featured drums, but added a slower version of the theme including lines from the chorus.

On September 25, 2019 during a 20-year cast reunion, Gavin Greenaway along with Gary Paben finally revealed the meaning of the word A-La, known only to Greenaway, Paben, Davies, and a select few Disney executives. During a presentation to the more than 250 performers who attended the reunion, it was revealed that A-La translated to "grateful."

For Epcot's twenty-fifth anniversary celebration on October 1, 2007, a special fireworks finale to Illuminations was set to the Tapestry of Nations and the Tapestry of Dreams soundtrack.

Tapestry of Nations

- Walt Disney World Millennium Celebration (1999)

Tapestry of Dreams

- Illuminations: Reflections of Earth / Tapestry of Dreams (2001)

Tapestry of Dreams "Suite of Dreams: Discovery"

- Magic in the Streets: Parade Memories (2001)

The music from the "Hymn to the North" segment from the Vancouver 2010 Olympic Winter Games opening ceremony, composed and produced by David Atkins was based on the Opening section from the Tapestry of Nations soundtrack.

== COVID-19 Performance ==
When the COVID-19 Pandemic closed much of the country, the Tapestry Alumni joined other current and former Walt Disney World stages and attractions in creating independent, unofficial performances to bring Disney parks experiences to the homes of fans. Along with such alumni groups as the Kids of the Kingdom, Festival of the Lion King, and The Great Movie Ride, the cast and crew of Tapestry of Nations recreated their show during the COVID-19 quarantine.

Premiering live on YouTube on August 15, 2020, Tapestry of Nations: Quarantine Edition featured a panel of former performers and staging specialists talking about their time with the show, followed by a performance of the entire parade.

More than 150 alumni cast members and their families recreated the processional, building homemade puppets, performing the original choreography, and recreating the special effects used with the original show. As an added element, the cast read real messages of thanks to the first responders and essential workers, replacing the original show's Sage of Time dialogue.

Tapestry Alumni and Tapestry of Nations: Quarantine Edition Executive Producer William Campbell has expressed interest in continuing to build upon the next generation of interest in the show and connecting with fans through the performance's YouTube Channel, Tapestry of Nations Alumni Archives.

According to posted videos and associated comments, the Alumni Archives is working on extended footage reels, as well as a long-form documentary.

== See also ==
- Epcot attraction and entertainment history
