= Tops In Blue =

US musical group (1953–2016)

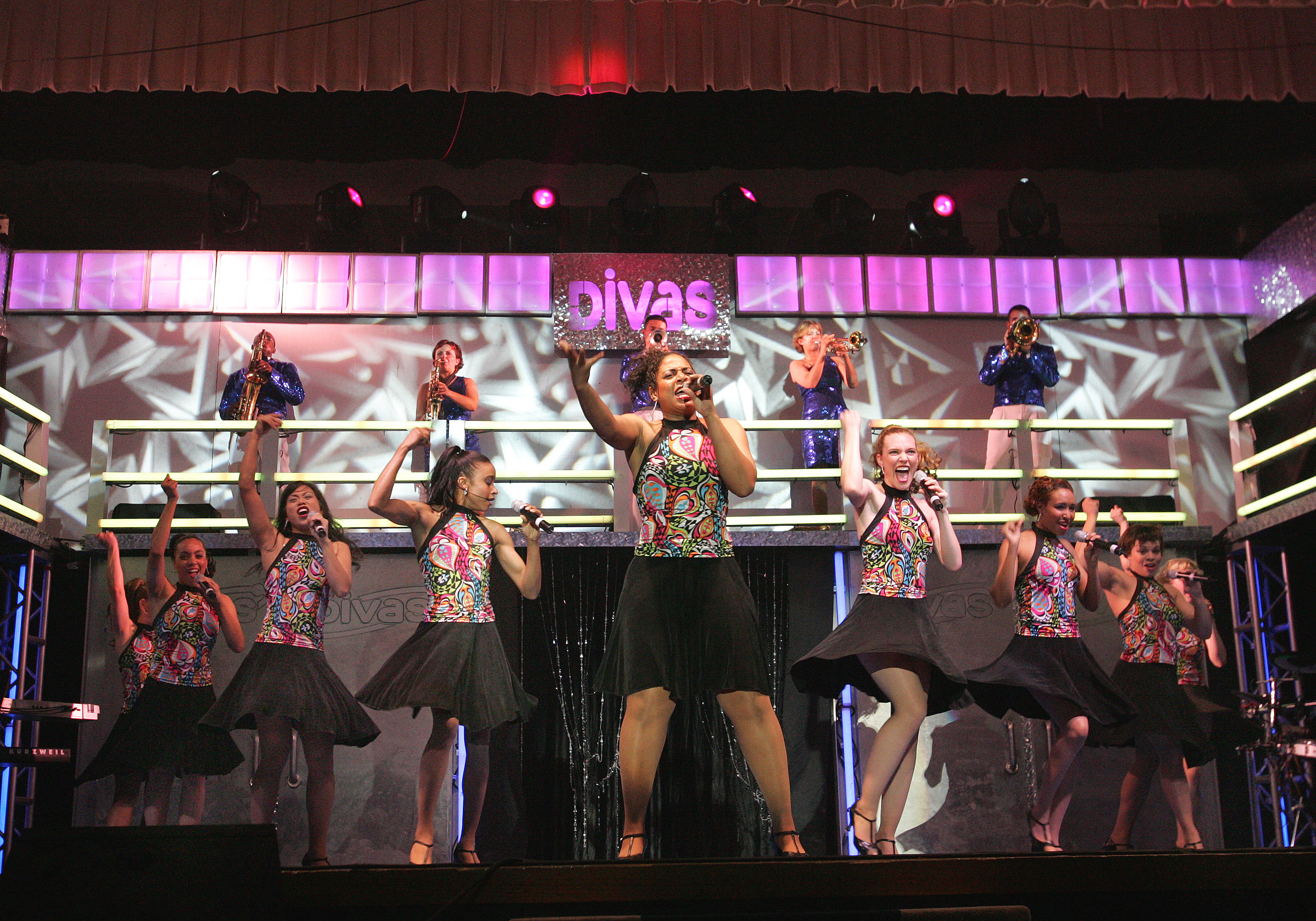
- Tops In Blue performing at Lackland Air Force Base, Texas

Background information
- Origin: United States Air Force
- Years active: 1953–2016
- Past members: Jerry Van Dyke; Terry Weeks; Kahlil Ashanti; Sinbad; Lane McCray
- Website: web.archive.org/web/20051221203207/http://www.topsinblue.com:80/

Tops In Blue was a touring performance ensemble made up of active duty members of the United States Air Force formed in 1953. For 63 years, Tops in Blue traveled to more than 20 countries to perform more than 120 times each year for airmen and families around the world. Each year, they performed in front of more than 250,000 military personnel and their families, presenting an average of 120 performances at 100 locations worldwide throughout the United States, Canada, Europe, Central America, and the Pacific.

== Ensemble ==
The ensemble was composed of 30–35 vocalists, dancers, musicians and technicians and was considered the Air Force's expeditionary entertainment unit. Members were expected to be in top physical condition because they were their own roadies. The team unloaded 60,000 pounds (27,000 kg) of equipment which used a stage and truss that was built to fit on 13 pallets or two truck trailers. They spent four to eight hours setting up the stage prior to a show and were responsible for tearing everything down immediately afterwards. Their primary purpose was to perform for military personnel and their families throughout the world. They have appeared on national television with Ed Sullivan, Bob Hope, Alabama, Barbara Mandrell, Boyz II Men, Lee Greenwood, and Lea Michele.

Tops in Blue was produced by the Entertainment Branch of the Programs Directorate, Headquarters Air Force Services Agency. The program was funded by appropriated and non-appropriated funds that are generated by Air Force people and was sponsored by Coca-Cola. They produced five movies and two albums.

The unit was self-contained with its members consisting of four flights: personnel, logistics, operations, and technical.

== Audition ==
Candidates for Tops in Blue submitted a video performance to Headquarters Air Force Services Agency. If selected for audition, they were flown from all over the world to Lackland AFB for a ten-day talent show and multilevel competition judged by former Tops in Blue members. The performers were picked in six categories: male vocalist, female vocalist, instrumentalist, musical variety, dance, and non-musical variety including comedians, magicians, and dramatists. Each year was a new group and past members were not guaranteed to return. Those selected attended a 45-day training period at Lackland AFB.

== History ==
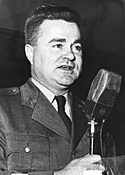
Major Al Reilly

Air Force Major Al Reilly created the Air Force Worldwide Talent Contest in 1953, and Tops in Blue began as a tour showcasing the best members of the contest performing at 230 locations in 235 days. Initially, the contest was judged in 14 categories ranging from comedy, drama, pop, jazz, hillbilly, vocal and instrumental. It was judged by celebrities like Barry White, Les Brown, Richard Roundtree, and Esther Williams. In 1954, Ed Sullivan invited Tops in Blue to perform at Mitchel Air Field, NY on his show "Toast of the Town" where Airman Second Class Jerry Van Dyke led the show as Master of Ceremonies. In 1964, Tops in Blue left the stage to record in a movie studio to produce films and records for distribution throughout the Air Force. However, in 1971 Tops in Blue gained Air Force support to return to the stage on their return to live tours in 1972.

== Notable events ==
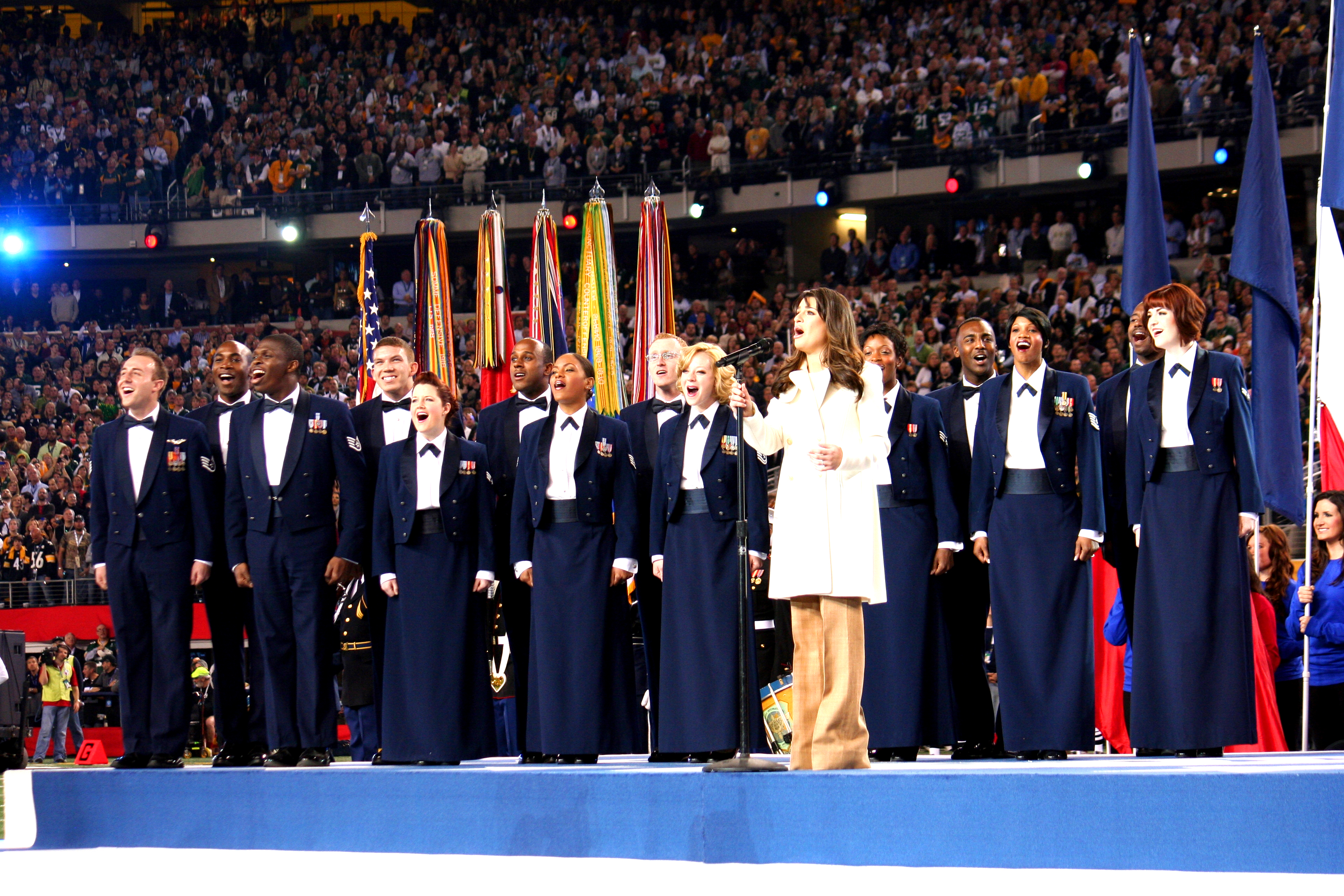
Tops In Blue perform "America the Beautiful" with Lea Michele at Super Bowl XLV.

In 1981 they performed the halftime show at the Garden State Bowl. In 1985, an expanded production of Tops in Blue performed with help from over 1,400 volunteers from Mather AFB at the halftime show of Super Bowl XIX. In 2002, they performed at the Daytona 500. They performed The Star-Spangled Banner in 2005 for Game 6 of the NBA Finals and in 2009 at the Coca-Cola 600. At the pregame show preceding Super Bowl XLV Tops in Blue performed "America the Beautiful" alongside actress Lea Michele.

== Controversy ==
Tops in Blue came under scrutiny due to decreasing military budgets and a perception that the show was not supported by the younger enlisted force (many of whom had never attended a performance). Many of these younger enlisted force when provided an Air Force questionnaire, viewed it as a "waste of time and money". The reported costs of the program were relatively low, but the unreported costs for salaries, injuries, overseas flights, lodging, etc. were estimated to be much higher. In addition to the monetary issues, there were reports of fraternization, dangerous work practices, mistreatment, and sexual harassment. In an October 2015 Air Force–wide survey, results from 4,700 responses showed that airmen between the ages of 25 and 34 generally had poor opinions of Tops in Blue. Many had never attended a performance and, despite widespread awareness of the program and the 60 year mission of boosting troops and families morale, only about 25% of respondents had attended an event. The reasons for nonattendance cited by the remaining 75% were popularity, limited seating in small venues, or disinterest. The survey revealed only 19% of the force was supportive of the program. The results of this survey triggered a review of the program and a suspension of the 2016 tour. The Air Force cited lukewarm interest and fiscal constraints as the primary reason for canceling.

== Cancellation ==
In December 2015 the Secretary of the Air Force announced the suspension of the 2016 season to allow an extended review of the program. The decision was made to pause the program and to reassess its mission, venue, themes and cost.

The Secretary of the Air Force permanently shut down Tops In Blue on 1 September 2016.

== See also ==
- United States Air Force
- The United States Air Force Band
- The Airmen of Note
