= Billboard Year-End Hot R&B/Hip-Hop Songs of 2017 =

This is a list of Billboard magazine's Top Hot R&B/Hip-Hop Songs of 2017.

No.	Title	Artist(s)
1	"That's What I Like"	Bruno Mars
2	"Humble."	Kendrick Lamar
3	"I'm the One"	DJ Khaled featuring Justin Bieber, Quavo, Chance the Rapper, and Lil Wayne
4	"Bad and Boujee"	Migos featuring Lil Uzi Vert
5	"Unforgettable"	French Montana featuring Swae Lee
6	"Congratulations"	Post Malone featuring Quavo
7	"Mask Off"	Future
8	"Wild Thoughts"	DJ Khaled featuring Rihanna and Bryson Tiller
9	"XO Tour Llif3"	Lil Uzi Vert
10	"Bodak Yellow"	Cardi B
11	"Black Beatles"	Rae Sremmurd featuring Gucci Mane
12	"24K Magic"	Bruno Mars
13	"Starboy"	The Weeknd featuring Daft Punk
14	"iSpy"	Kyle featuring Lil Yachty
15	"Redbone"	Childish Gambino
16	"1-800-273-8255"	Logic featuring Alessia Cara and Khalid
17	"I Feel It Coming"	The Weeknd featuring Daft Punk
18	"Fake Love"	Drake
19	"Bounce Back"	Big Sean
20	"Bad Things"	Machine Gun Kelly and Camila Cabello
21	"Love on the Brain"	Rihanna
22	"Location"	Khalid
23	"Bank Account"	21 Savage
24	"Rake It Up"	Yo Gotti featuring Nicki Minaj
25	"T-Shirt"	Migos
26	"Tunnel Vision"	Kodak Black
27	"Rockstar"	Post Malone featuring 21 Savage
28	"Rolex"	Ayo & Teo
29	"DNA"	Kendrick Lamar
30	"Juju on That Beat (TZ Anthem)"	Zay Hilfigerrr & Zayion McCall
31	"Passionfruit"	Drake
32	"Swang"	Rae Sremmurd
33	"Loyalty."	Kendrick Lamar
34	"Slide"	Calvin Harris featuring Frank Ocean and Migos
35	"Drowning"	A Boogie wit da Hoodie featuring Kodak Black
36	"Both"	Gucci Mane featuring Drake
37	"Caroline"	Aminé
38	"Feels"	Calvin Harris featuring Pharrell Williams, Katy Perry and Big Sean
39	"Love Galore"	SZA featuring Travis Scott
40	"Slippery"	Migos featuring Gucci Mane
41	"Young Dumb & Broke"	Khalid
42	"Magnolia"	Playboi Carti
43	"Everyday We Lit"	YFN Lucci featuring PnB Rock
44	"Do Re Mi"	Blackbear
45	"I Get the Bag"	Gucci Mane featuring Migos
46	"Butterfly Effect"	Travis Scott
47	"Look at Me!"	XXXTentacion
48	"Crew"	GoldLink featuring Brent Faiyaz and Shy Glizzy
49	"Love."	Kendrick Lamar featuring Zacari
50	"Party"	Chris Brown featuring Usher and Gucci Mane
51	"Deja Vu"	J. Cole
52	"Portland"	Drake featuring Quavo and Travis Scott
53	"It's a Vibe"	2 Chainz featuring Ty Dolla Sign, Trey Songz and Jhené Aiko
54	"The Weekend"	SZA
55	"First Day Out"	Tee Grizzley
56	"Party Monster"	The Weeknd
57	"Love Me Now"	John Legend
58	"Gucci Gang"	Lil Pump
59	"Versace on the Floor"	Bruno Mars
60	"Goosebumps"	Travis Scott
61	"Moves"	Big Sean
62	"Used to This"	Future featuring Drake
63	"Losin Control"	Russ
64	"The Race"	Tay-K
65	"Ooouuu"	Young M.A
66	"Privacy"	Chris Brown
67	"Whatever You Need"	Meek Mill featuring Chris Brown and Ty Dolla Sign
68	"Shining"	DJ Khaled featuring Beyoncé and Jay-Z
69	"No Heart"	21 Savage and Metro Boomin
70	"The Way Life Goes"	Lil Uzi Vert featuring Nicki Minaj
71	"Reminder"	The Weeknd
72	"Roll in Peace"	Kodak Black featuring XXXTentacion
73	"Good Drank"	2 Chainz featuring Quavo and Gucci Mane
74	"X"	21 Savage and Metro Boomin featuring Future
75	"Jocelyn Flores"	XXXTentacion
76	"Element."	Kendrick Lamar
77	"Chill Bill"	Rob Stone featuring J. Davis and Spooks
78	"No Limit"	G-Eazy featuring ASAP Rocky and Cardi B
79	"Wokeuplikethis"	Playboi Carti featuring Lil Uzi Vert
80	"Selfish"	PnB Rock
81	"I Fall Apart"	Post Malone
82	"Relationship"	Young Thug featuring Future
83	"Gyalchester"	Drake
84	"Transportin'"	Kodak Black
85	"Selfish"	Future featuring Rihanna
86	"B.E.D."	Jacquees
87	"Broccoli"	DRAM featuring Lil Yachty
88	"Fuck Love"	XXXTentacion featuring Trippie Redd
89	"4 AM"	2 Chainz featuring Travis Scott
90	"Neighbors"	J. Cole
91	"Pills & Automobiles"	Chris Brown featuring Yo Gotti, A Boogie wit da Hoodie and Kodak Black
92	"No Frauds"	Nicki Minaj, Drake and Lil Wayne
93	"Sneakin'"	Drake featuring 21 Savage
94	"Sauce It Up"	Lil Uzi Vert
95	"Do You Mind"	DJ Khaled featuring Nicki Minaj, Chris Brown, August Alsina, Jeremih, Future and Rick Ross
96	"Prblms"	6lack
97	"You Was Right"	Lil Uzi Vert
98	"Questions"	Chris Brown
99	"No Complaints"	Metro Boomin featuring Offset and Drake
100	"Too Much Sauce"	DJ Esco featuring Future and Lil Uzi Vert

== See also ==
- 2017 in music
- Billboard Year-End Hot 100 singles of 2017
- Billboard Year-End Hot Rap Songs of 2017
- List of number-one R&B/hip-hop songs of 2017 (U.S.)
