= List of Billboard Hot 100 top-ten singles in 2017 =

This is a list of singles that charted in the top ten of the Billboard Hot 100, an all-genre singles chart, in 2017.

66 songs were in the top 10 in 2017, eleven of which peaked in either 2016, 2018, or 2019.

== Top-ten singles ==
Key

- ↑ – indicates single's top 10 entry was also its Hot 100 debut
- (#) – 2017 year-end top 10 single position and rank
- The "weeks in top ten" column reflects each song's entire chart life, not just its run during 2017.

List of Billboard Hot 100 top ten singles that peaked in 2017
Top ten entry date	Single	Artist(s)	Peak	Peak date	Weeks in top ten	References
Singles from 2016
October 15	"Starboy"	The Weeknd featuring Daft Punk	1	January 7	19	
November 5	"Don't Wanna Know"^{[C]}	Maroon 5 featuring Kendrick Lamar	6	February 18	14	
November 19	"Fake Love"^{[A]}^{[E]}	Drake	8	February 18	6	
December 24	"Bad Things"^{[A]}^{[C]}	Machine Gun Kelly and Camila Cabello	4	February 11	10	
December 31	"I Don't Wanna Live Forever"^{[D]} ↑	Zayn and Taylor Swift	2	March 4	12	
Singles from 2017
January 14	"Bad and Boujee" (#6)	Migos featuring Lil Uzi Vert	1	January 21	14	
January 28	"Shape of You" (#1) ↑	Ed Sheeran	1	January 28	33	
January 28	"Castle on the Hill" ↑	Ed Sheeran	6	January 28	1	
February 4	"Paris"^{[F]}^{[G]} ↑	The Chainsmokers	6	March 11	10	
February 11	"Scars to Your Beautiful"	Alessia Cara	8	February 25	3	
February 25	"Million Reasons"	Lady Gaga	4	February 25	1	
February 25	"Bounce Back"	Big Sean	6	February 25	5	
March 4	"Chained to the Rhythm" ↑	Katy Perry featuring Skip Marley	4	March 4	2	
March 4	"That's What I Like" (#3)	Bruno Mars	1	May 13	28	
March 4	"Love on the Brain"	Rihanna	5	March 25	5	
March 4	"I Feel It Coming"^{[H]}	The Weeknd featuring Daft Punk	4	April 15	5	
March 18	"Something Just Like This" (#5) ^{[H]}	The Chainsmokers and Coldplay	3	April 15	17	
March 18	"Tunnel Vision"	Kodak Black	6	March 25	6	
March 25	"Rockabye"^{[J]}	Clean Bandit featuring Sean Paul and Anne-Marie	9	March 25	2	
April 1	"iSpy"^{[I]}	Kyle featuring Lil Yachty	4	April 22	8	
April 8	"Passionfruit" ↑	Drake	8	April 8	2	
April 8	"Portland" ↑	Drake featuring Quavo and Travis Scott	9	April 8	1	
April 22	"Humble" (#4) ↑	Kendrick Lamar	1	May 6	15	
April 22	"Body Like a Back Road" (#8) ^{[M]}^{[N]}	Sam Hunt	6	April 22	8	
April 29	"Sign of the Times" ↑	Harry Styles	4	April 29	1	
April 29	"Mask Off"	Future	5	May 6	12	
April 29	"XO Tour Llif3"	Lil Uzi Vert	7	June 24	10	
May 6	"DNA" ↑	Kendrick Lamar	4	May 6	2	
May 6	"Stay"^{[K]}	Zedd and Alessia Cara	7	May 6	8	
May 6	"Despacito" (#2)	Luis Fonsi and Daddy Yankee featuring Justin Bieber	1	May 27	25	
May 13	"It Ain't Me"^{[L]}	Kygo and Selena Gomez	10	May 13	3	
May 20	"I'm the One" ↑	DJ Khaled featuring Justin Bieber, Quavo, Chance the Rapper and Lil Wayne	1	May 20	15	
June 3	"Malibu"	Miley Cyrus	10	June 3	1	
June 17	"Congratulations" (#10)	Post Malone featuring Quavo	8	July 8	6	
July 8	"Wild Thoughts" ↑	DJ Khaled featuring Rihanna and Bryson Tiller	2	July 29	13	
July 15	"Believer" (#9)	Imagine Dragons	4	August 26	14	
July 22	"Unforgettable"	French Montana featuring Swae Lee	3	August 19	16	
July 29	"There's Nothing Holdin' Me Back"	Shawn Mendes	6	August 26	10	
August 5	"Attention"	Charlie Puth	5	August 26	10	
August 26	"Bodak Yellow"	Cardi B	1	October 7	20	
September 9	"Rake It Up"^{[O]}	Yo Gotti featuring Nicki Minaj	8	October 7	3	
September 16	"Look What You Made Me Do"	Taylor Swift	1	September 16	8	
September 16	"1-800-273-8255"	Logic featuring Alessia Cara and Khalid	3	September 30	12	
September 16	"Strip That Down"	Liam Payne featuring Quavo	10	September 16	1	
September 23	"...Ready for It?" ↑	Taylor Swift	4	September 23	1	
September 30	"Too Good at Goodbyes"^{[P]} ↑	Sam Smith	4	November 25	16	
October 7	"Rockstar" ↑	Post Malone featuring 21 Savage	1	October 28	25	
October 7	"Feel It Still"	Portugal. The Man	4	November 4	11	
October 14	"Sorry Not Sorry"^{[S]}	Demi Lovato	6	November 11	7	
October 21	"Mi Gente"	J Balvin and Willy William featuring Beyoncé	3	October 21	7	
October 21	"Thunder"	Imagine Dragons	4	December 2	18	
November 11	"Perfect"^{[Q]}	Ed Sheeran^{1}	1	December 23	27	
November 18	"Gucci Gang"^{[R]}	Lil Pump	3	December 2	9	
November 25	"What Lovers Do"^{[S]}	Maroon 5 featuring SZA	9	November 25	4	
December 30	"MotorSport"	Migos, Nicki Minaj, and Cardi B	6	December 30	7	

=== 2016 peaks ===
List of Billboard Hot 100 top ten singles in 2017 that peaked in 2016
Top ten entry date	Single	Artist(s)	Peak	Peak date	Weeks in top ten	References
August 20	"Closer" (#7) ↑	The Chainsmokers featuring Halsey	1	September 3	32	
October 1	"Let Me Love You"	DJ Snake featuring Justin Bieber	4	October 8	17	
October 8	"Broccoli"^{[B]}	DRAM featuring Lil Yachty	5	November 5	12	
October 29	"24K Magic" ↑	Bruno Mars	4	December 10	15	
October 29	"Side to Side"	Ariana Grande featuring Nicki Minaj	4	December 3	14	
November 12	"Juju on That Beat (TZ Anthem)"	Zay Hilfigerrr & Zayion McCall	5	December 10	10	
November 19	"Black Beatles"	Rae Sremmurd featuring Gucci Mane	1	November 26	14	

=== 2018 peaks ===
List of Billboard Hot 100 top ten singles in 2017 that peaked in 2018
Top ten entry date	Single	Artist(s)	Peak	Peak date	Weeks in top ten	References
November 11	"Havana"	Camila Cabello featuring Young Thug	1	January 27	23	
December 16	"No Limit"	G-Eazy featuring ASAP Rocky and Cardi B	4	January 6	9	
December 23	"Bad at Love"	Halsey	5	January 27	10	

=== Holiday season ===
Holiday title first making the Billboard Hot 100 top ten during the 2017–18 holiday season
Top ten entry date	Single	Artist(s)	Peak	Peak date	Weeks in top ten	Ref.
December 30, 2017	"All I Want for Christmas Is You"	Mariah Carey	1	December 21, 2019	43	

== Notes ==
^{1} The duet version of "Perfect", by Ed Sheeran and Beyoncé, was the billing on the chart from December 23, 2017 to January 13, 2018.

^{A} The single re-entered the top ten on the week ending January 7, 2017.
^{B} The single re-entered the top ten on the week ending January 14, 2017.
^{C} The single re-entered the top ten on the week ending January 21, 2017.
^{D} The single re-entered the top ten on the week ending February 4, 2017.
^{E} The single re-entered the top ten on the week ending February 11, 2017.
^{F} The single re-entered the top ten on the week ending February 25, 2017.
^{G} The single re-entered the top ten on the week ending March 11, 2017.
^{H} The single re-entered the top ten on the week ending April 1, 2017.
^{I} The single re-entered the top ten on the week ending April 15, 2017.
^{J} The single re-entered the top ten on the week ending April 22, 2017.
^{K} The single re-entered the top ten on the week ending May 27, 2017.
^{L} The single re-entered the top ten on the week ending June 10, 2017.
^{M} The single re-entered the top ten on the week ending July 22, 2017.
^{N} The single re-entered the top ten on the week ending September 2, 2017.
^{O} The single re-entered the top ten on the week ending October 7, 2017.
^{P} The single re-entered the top ten on the week ending October 28, 2017.
^{Q} The single re-entered the top ten on the week ending November 25, 2017.
^{R} The single re-entered the top ten on the week ending December 2, 2017.
^{S} The single re-entered the top ten on the week ending December 9, 2017.

== Artists with most top-ten songs ==
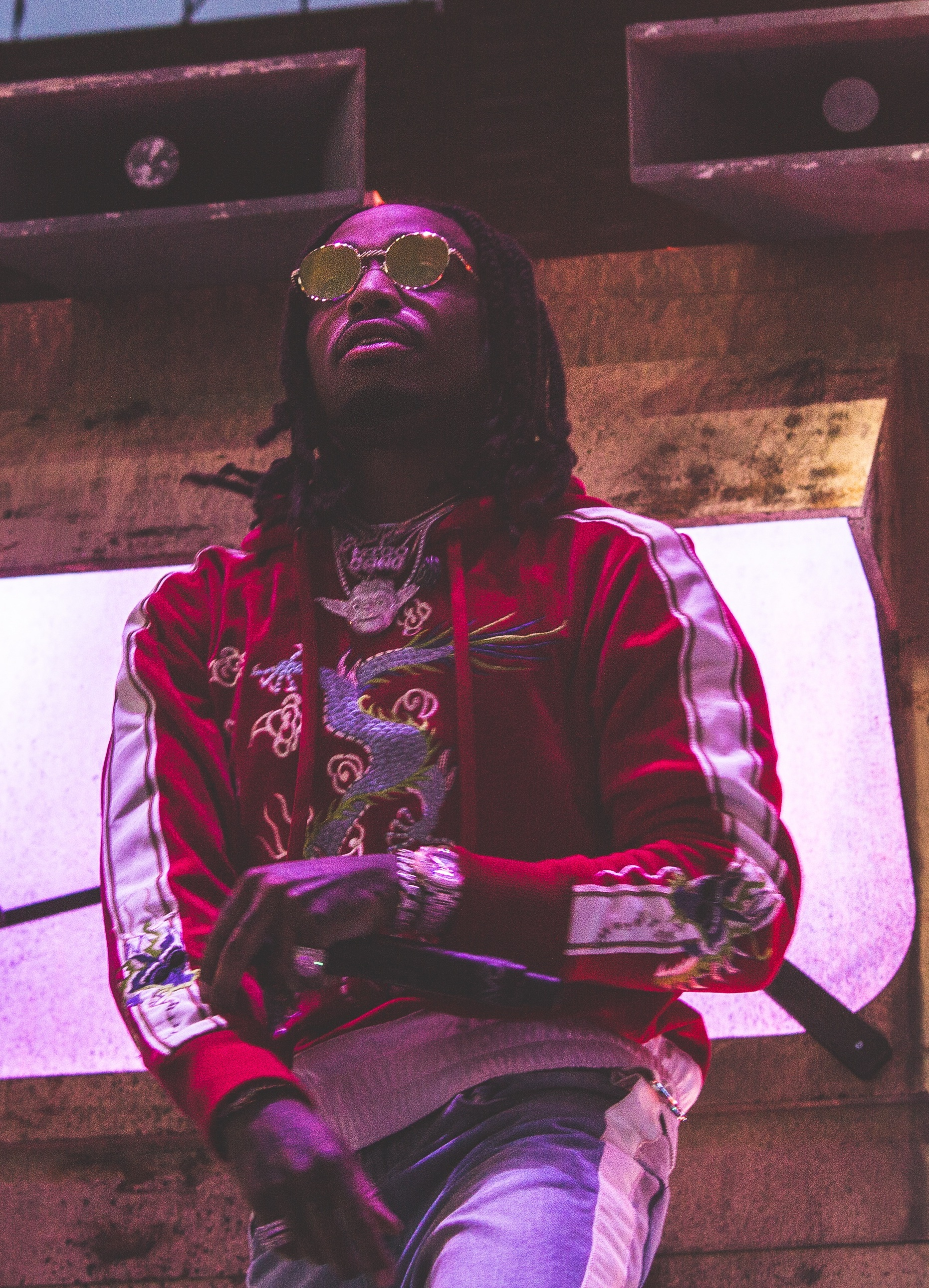
Quavo (pictured) has the most top ten hits in 2017 with six, two of which are as part of Migos and the other four as a featuring artist.

List of artists by total songs peaking in the top-ten
Artist	Numbers of songs
Quavo	4
Alessia Cara	3
Cardi B	3
The Chainsmokers	3
Drake	3
Ed Sheeran	3
Justin Bieber	3
Kendrick Lamar	3
Nicki Minaj	3
Taylor Swift	3
Bruno Mars	2
Camila Cabello	2
Daft Punk	2
DJ Khaled	2
Halsey	2
Imagine Dragons	2
Lil Uzi Vert	2
Lil Yachty	2
Maroon 5	2
Migos	2
Post Malone	2
Rihanna	2
The Weeknd	2

== See also ==
- 2017 in American music
- List of Billboard Hot 100 number ones of 2017
- Billboard Year-End Hot 100 singles of 2017
