= Billboard Year-End Hot 100 singles of 2017 =

Ranking of recorded music

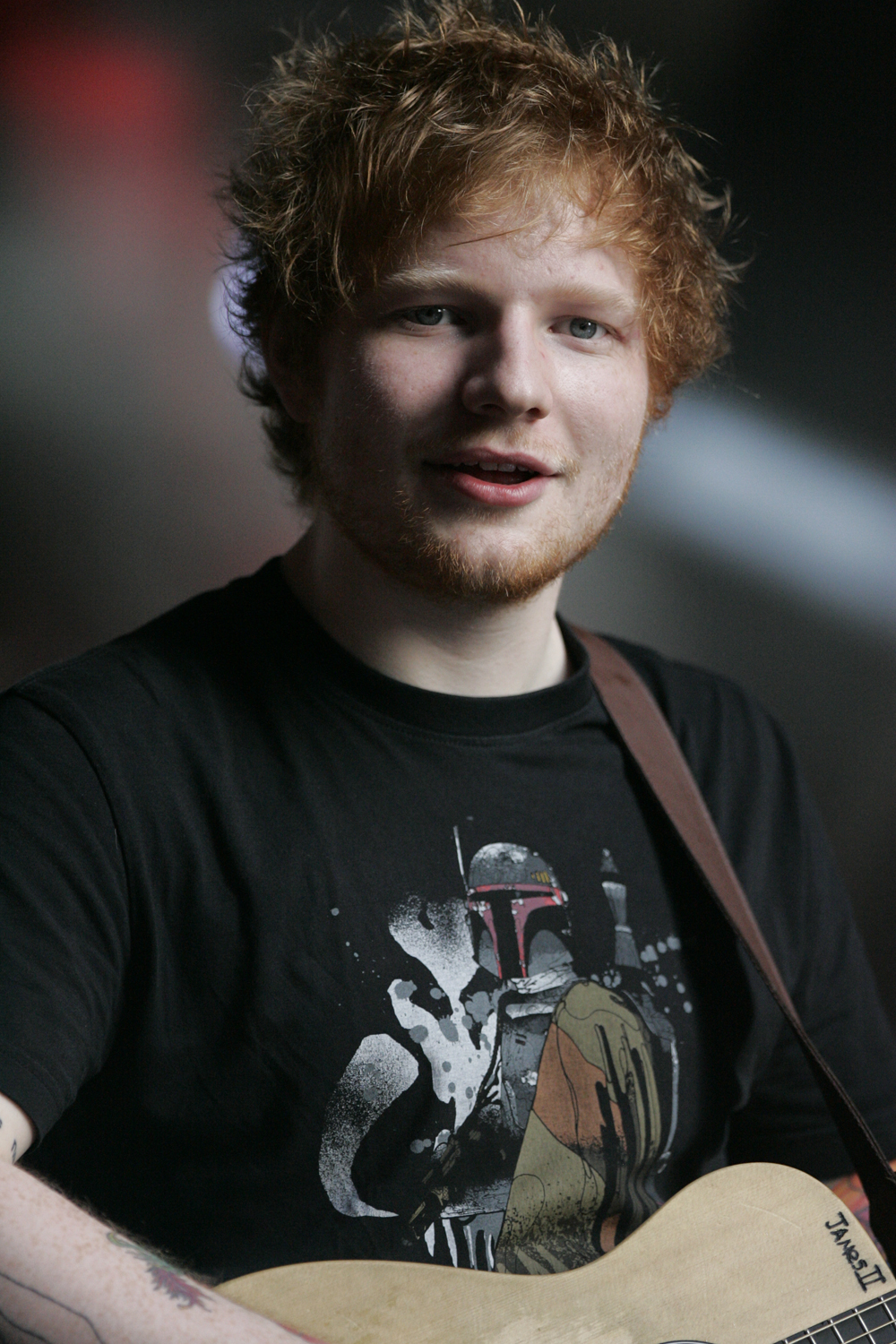
"Shape of You" by Ed Sheeran came in at number one, spending a total of twelve nonconsecutive weeks at the top position of the Billboard Hot 100 during 2017. "Castle on the Hill" from the same album also made the list, at position 40.

The Billboard Hot 100 is a chart that ranks the best-performing singles of the United States. Its data, published by Billboard magazine and compiled by Nielsen SoundScan, is based collectively on each single's weekly physical and digital sales, as well as airplay and streaming. At the end of a year, Billboard will publish an annual list of the 100 most successful songs throughout that year on the Hot 100 chart based on the information. For 2017, the list was published on December 11, calculated with data from December 3, 2016 to November 25, 2017.

"Closer" by The Chainsmokers featuring Halsey was listed within the top 10 for the second year in a row, making it only the third song in history to achieve this, after Elton John's "Candle in the Wind 1997" and LeAnn Rimes' "How Do I Live", both of which were ranked in the top ten of the 1997 and 1998 lists.

Ed Sheeran was named the top Hot 100 artist of 2017. He scored the number-one Hot 100 song of the year with "Shape of You", one of two songs he placed on the list.

== Year-end list ==
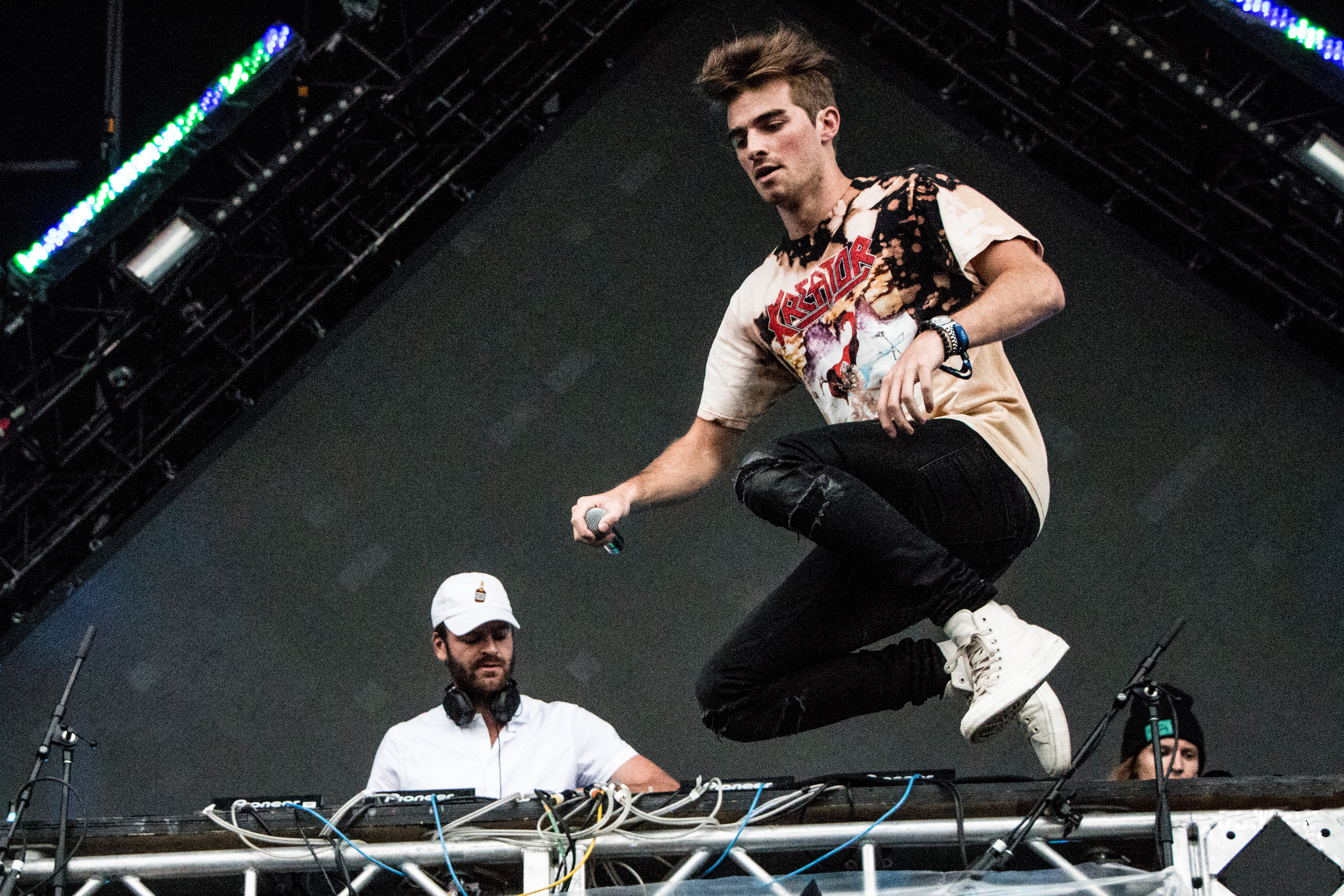
Three songs from The Chainsmokers appear on the list, with "Something Just Like This" at number 5, "Closer" at number 7 (second consecutive year in the top 10), and "Paris" at number 42.

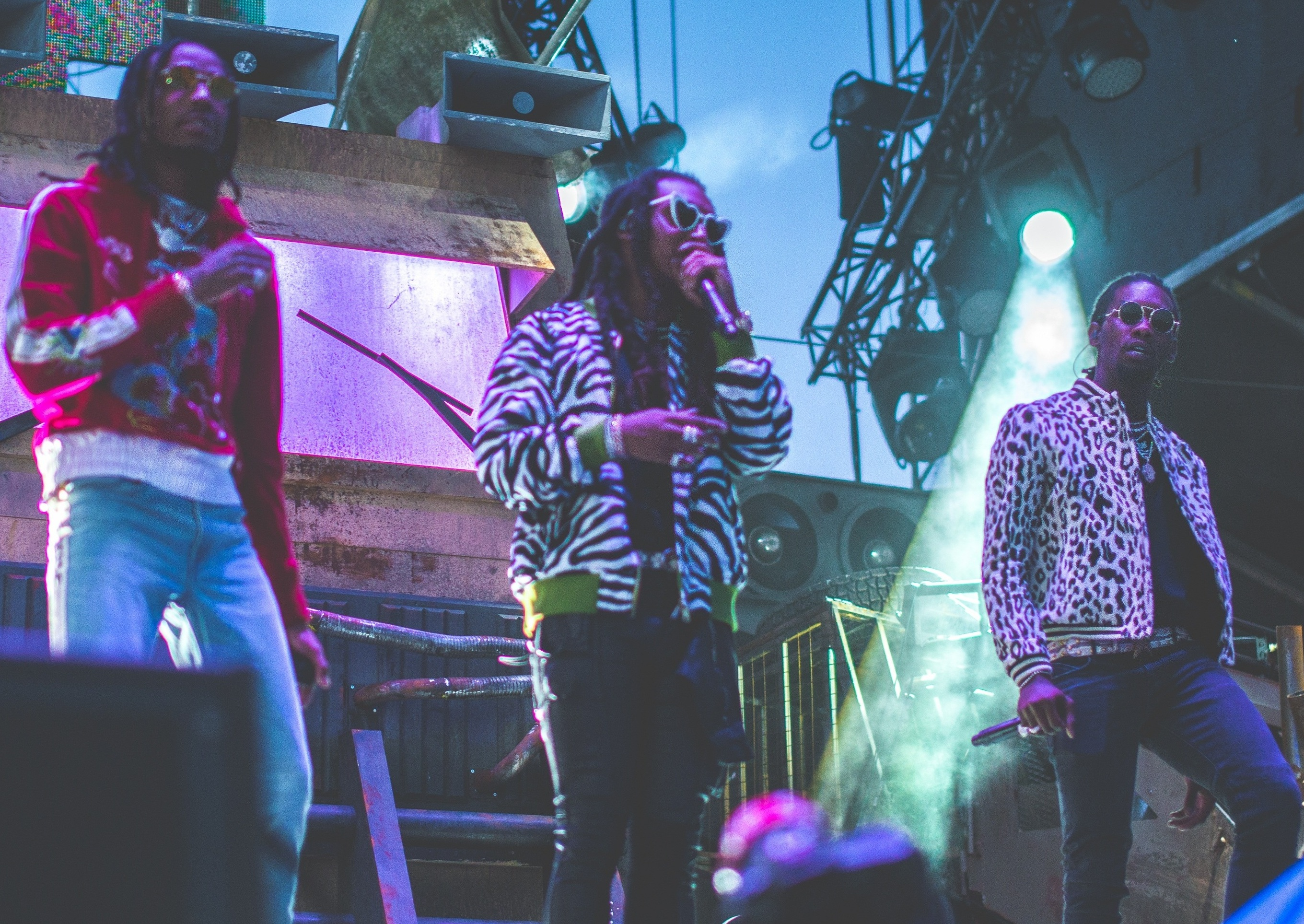
American rap trio Migos charted five songs on the list with their number-one single "Bad and Boujee" featuring Lil Uzi Vert being the highest among them at number 6. One of its members, Quavo, is also featured in three songs by other artists in the top 40.

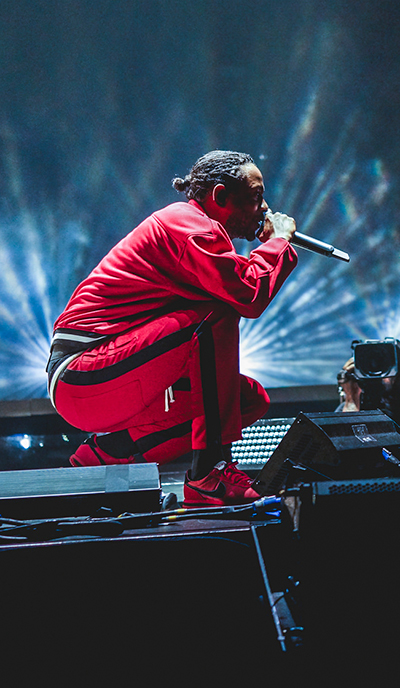
American rapper Kendrick Lamar charted 4 songs on the list with the highest-ranking being his number-one single "Humble" at number 4.

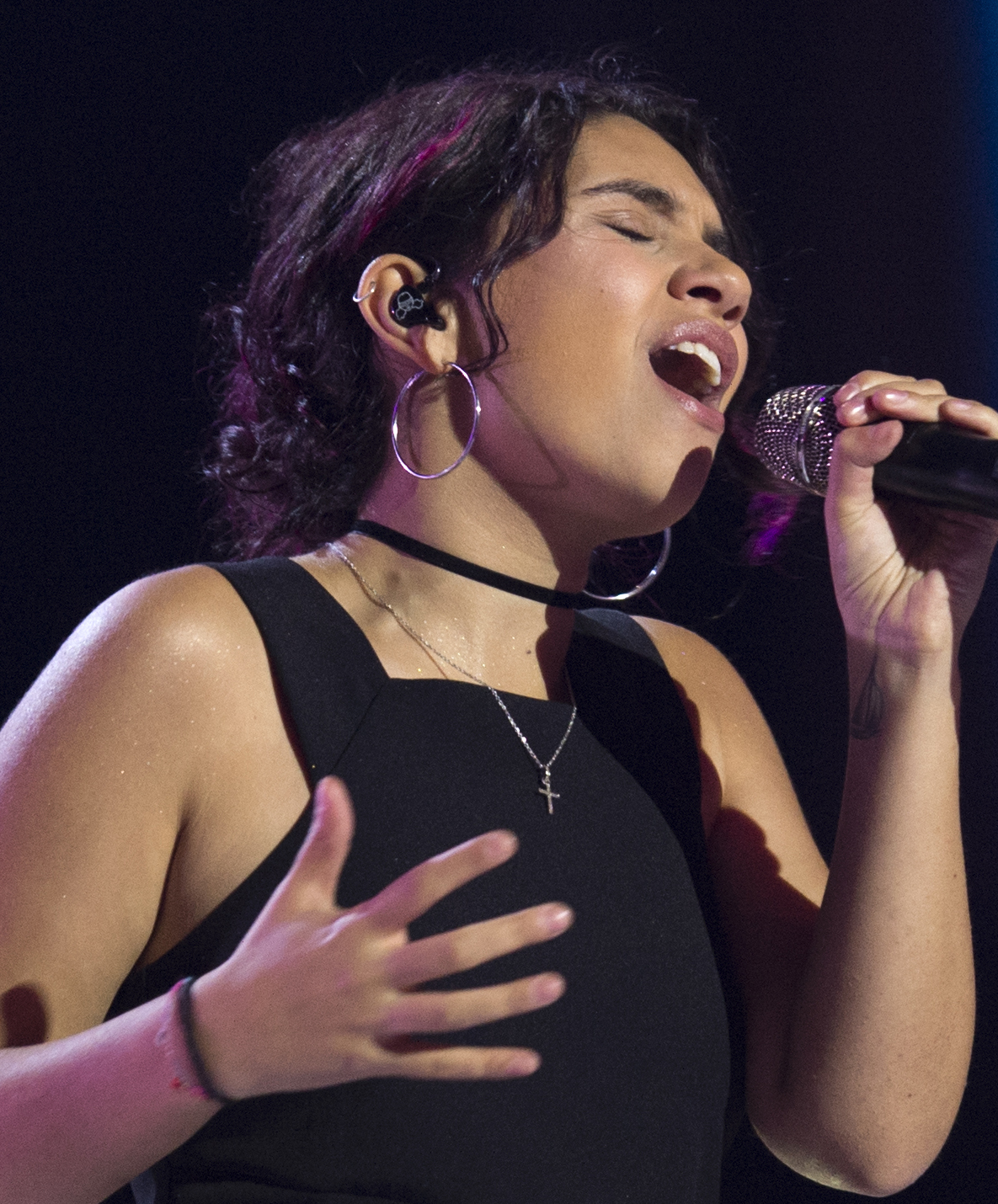
Canadian singer Alessia Cara has three songs within the top 40, with "Stay" (with Zedd) at number 17, "Scars to Your Beautiful" at number 30, and "1-800-273-8255" (with Logic and Khalid) at number 31.

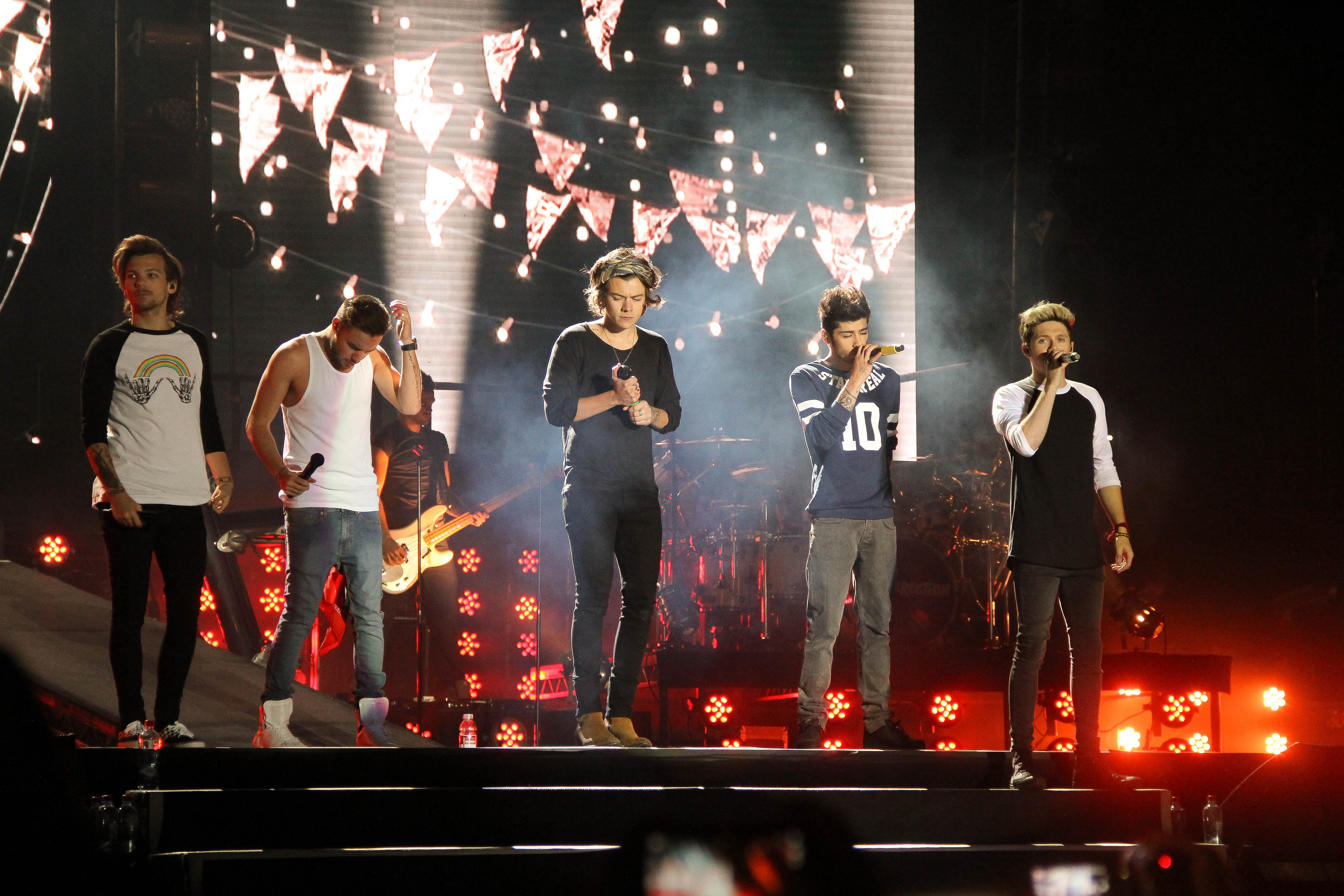
With the exception of Louis Tomlinson, each member of the English-Irish boy band One Direction had at least one song on the list, with Zayn at number 26 with "I Don't Wanna Live Forever" (a duet with Taylor Swift), Niall Horan at number 32 with "Slow Hands", Liam Payne at number 36 with "Strip That Down" (featuring Quavo), and Harry Styles at number 87 with "Sign of the Times".

List of songs on Billboard's 2017 Year-End Hot 100 chart
No.	Title	Artist(s)
1	"Shape of You"	Ed Sheeran
2	"Despacito (Remix)"	Luis Fonsi and Daddy Yankee featuring Justin Bieber
3	"That's What I Like"	Bruno Mars
4	"Humble"	Kendrick Lamar
5	"Something Just Like This"	The Chainsmokers and Coldplay
6	"Bad and Boujee"	Migos featuring Lil Uzi Vert
7	"Closer"	The Chainsmokers featuring Halsey
8	"Body Like a Back Road"	Sam Hunt
9	"Believer"	Imagine Dragons
10	"Congratulations"	Post Malone featuring Quavo
11	"Say You Won't Let Go"	James Arthur
12	"I'm the One"	DJ Khaled featuring Justin Bieber, Quavo, Chance the Rapper and Lil Wayne
13	"XO Tour Llif3"	Lil Uzi Vert
14	"Mask Off"	Future
15	"Unforgettable"	French Montana featuring Swae Lee
16	"24K Magic"	Bruno Mars
17	"Stay"	Zedd and Alessia Cara
18	"Wild Thoughts"	DJ Khaled featuring Rihanna and Bryson Tiller
19	"Black Beatles"	Rae Sremmurd featuring Gucci Mane
20	"Starboy"	The Weeknd featuring Daft Punk
21	"Location"	Khalid
22	"Attention"	Charlie Puth
23	"There's Nothing Holdin' Me Back"	Shawn Mendes
24	"Bodak Yellow"	Cardi B
25	"Redbone"	Childish Gambino
26	"I Don't Wanna Live Forever"	Zayn and Taylor Swift
27	"It Ain't Me"	Kygo and Selena Gomez
28	"iSpy"	Kyle featuring Lil Yachty
29	"Issues"	Julia Michaels
30	"Scars to Your Beautiful"	Alessia Cara
31	"1-800-273-8255"	Logic featuring Alessia Cara and Khalid
32	"Slow Hands"	Niall Horan
33	"Love on the Brain"	Rihanna
34	"I Feel It Coming"	The Weeknd featuring Daft Punk
35	"Bounce Back"	Big Sean
36	"Strip That Down"	Liam Payne featuring Quavo
37	"Fake Love"	Drake
38	"Don't Wanna Know"	Maroon 5 featuring Kendrick Lamar
39	"Look What You Made Me Do"	Taylor Swift
40	"Castle on the Hill"	Ed Sheeran
41	"Bad Things"	Machine Gun Kelly and Camila Cabello
42	"Paris"	The Chainsmokers
43	"Side to Side"	Ariana Grande featuring Nicki Minaj
44	"Rockabye"	Clean Bandit featuring Sean Paul and Anne-Marie
45	"Feel It Still"	Portugal. The Man
46	"Let Me Love You"	DJ Snake featuring Justin Bieber
47	"Sorry Not Sorry"	Demi Lovato
48	"Bank Account"	21 Savage
49	"Can't Stop the Feeling!"	Justin Timberlake
50	"Mi Gente"	J Balvin and Willy William featuring Beyoncé
51	"Thunder"	Imagine Dragons
52	"T-shirt"	Migos
53	"Rake It Up"	Yo Gotti featuring Nicki Minaj
54	"Mercy"	Shawn Mendes
55	"Tunnel Vision"	Kodak Black
56	"Rockstar"	Post Malone featuring 21 Savage
57	"In Case You Didn't Know"	Brett Young
58	"Heathens"	Twenty One Pilots
59	"Now or Never"	Halsey
60	"Caroline"	Aminé
61	"Rolex"	Ayo & Teo
62	"DNA"	Kendrick Lamar
63	"Juju on That Beat (TZ Anthem)"	Zay Hilfigerrr & Zayion McCall
64	"Swang"	Rae Sremmurd
65	"Passionfruit"	Drake
66	"Loyalty"	Kendrick Lamar featuring Rihanna
67	"Praying"	Kesha
68	"Goosebumps"	Travis Scott
69	"Cold"	Maroon 5 featuring Future
70	"Broccoli"	DRAM featuring Lil Yachty
71	"Slide"	Calvin Harris featuring Frank Ocean and Migos
72	"What Ifs"	Kane Brown featuring Lauren Alaina
73	"Chained to the Rhythm"	Katy Perry featuring Skip Marley
74	"Feels"	Calvin Harris featuring Pharrell Williams, Katy Perry and Big Sean
75	"All Time Low"	Jon Bellion
76	"Hurricane"	Luke Combs
77	"Too Good at Goodbyes"	Sam Smith
78	"Young Dumb & Broke"	Khalid
79	"Magnolia"	Playboi Carti
80	"Love Galore"	SZA featuring Travis Scott
81	"Drowning"	A Boogie wit da Hoodie featuring Kodak Black
82	"Starving"	Hailee Steinfeld and Grey featuring Zedd
83	"Both"	Gucci Mane featuring Drake
84	"What About Us"	P!nk
85	"Swalla"	Jason Derulo featuring Nicki Minaj and Ty Dolla Sign
86	"Slippery"	Migos featuring Gucci Mane
87	"Sign of the Times"	Harry Styles
88	"Water Under the Bridge"	Adele
89	"Malibu"	Miley Cyrus
90	"Down"	Marian Hill
91	"No Promises"	Cheat Codes featuring Demi Lovato
92	"Treat You Better"	Shawn Mendes
93	"I Get the Bag"	Gucci Mane featuring Migos
94	"Small Town Boy"	Dustin Lynch
95	"Everyday We Lit"	YFN Lucci featuring PnB Rock
96	"Havana"	Camila Cabello featuring Young Thug
97	"What Lovers Do"	Maroon 5 featuring SZA
98	"Do Re Mi"	Blackbear
99	"Look at Me!"	XXXTentacion
100	"The Fighter"	Keith Urban featuring Carrie Underwood

== See also ==
- 2017 in American music
- Billboard Year-End Hot R&B/Hip-Hop Songs of 2017
- Billboard Year-End Hot Rap Songs of 2017
- List of Billboard Hot 100 number-one singles of 2017
- List of Billboard Hot 100 top-ten singles in 2017
