= Billboard Year-End Hot Rap Songs of 2017 =

American music chart

This is a list of Billboard magazine's Top Hot Rap Songs of 2017.

No.	Title	Artist(s)
1	"Humble"	Kendrick Lamar
2	"I'm the One"	DJ Khaled featuring Justin Bieber, Quavo, Chance the Rapper, and Lil Wayne
3	"Bad and Boujee"	Migos featuring Lil Uzi Vert
4	"Unforgettable"	French Montana featuring Swae Lee
5	"Congratulations"	Post Malone featuring Quavo
6	"Mask Off"	Future
7	"XO Tour Llif3"	Lil Uzi Vert
8	"Bodak Yellow"	Cardi B
9	"Black Beatles"	Rae Sremmurd featuring Gucci Mane
10	"iSpy"	Kyle featuring Lil Yachty
11	"1-800-273-8255"	Logic featuring Alessia Cara and Khalid
12	"Fake Love"	Drake
13	"Bounce Back"	Big Sean
14	"Bad Things"	Machine Gun Kelly and Camila Cabello
15	"Bank Account"	21 Savage
16	"T-Shirt"	Migos
17	"Rake It Up"	Yo Gotti featuring Nicki Minaj
18	"Tunnel Vision"	Kodak Black
19	"Rockstar"	Post Malone featuring 21 Savage
20	"Rolex"	Ayo & Teo
21	"DNA"	Kendrick Lamar
22	"Juju on That Beat (TZ Anthem)"	Zay Hilfigerrr & Zayion McCall
23	"Loyalty"	Kendrick Lamar featuring Rihanna
24	"Swang"	Rae Sremmurd
25	"Both"	Gucci Mane featuring Drake
26	"Caroline"	Aminé
27	"Drowning"	A Boogie wit da Hoodie
28	"Slippery"	Migos featuring Gucci Mane
29	"Magnolia"	Playboi Carti
30	"I Get the Bag"	Gucci Mane featuring Migos
31	"Look at Me!"	XXXTentacion
32	"Everyday We Lit"	YFN Lucci featuring PnB Rock
33	"Love"	Kendrick Lamar featuring Zacari
34	"Crew"	GoldLink featuring Brent Faiyaz and Shy Glizzy
35	"Butterfly Effect"	Travis Scott
36	"Deja Vu"	J. Cole
37	"It's a Vibe"	2 Chainz featuring Ty Dolla Sign, Trey Songz and Jhené Aiko
38	"Portland"	Drake featuring Quavo and Travis Scott
39	"Gucci Gang"	Lil Pump
40	"Ooouuu"	Young M.A
41	"Used to This"	Future featuring Drake
42	"The Race"	Tay-K
43	"First Day Out"	Tee Grizzley
44	"Goosebumps"	Travis Scott
45	"No Heart"	21 Savage and Metro Boomin
46	"The Way Life Goes"	Lil Uzi Vert featuring Nicki Minaj
47	"Roll in Peace"	Kodak Black featuring XXXTentacion
48	"X"	21 Savage and Metro Boomin
49	"Moves"	Big Sean
50	"Chill Bill"	Rob Stone featuring J. Davis and Spooks

== See also ==
- 2017 in music
- Billboard Year-End Hot 100 singles of 2017
- Billboard Year-End Hot R&B/Hip-Hop Songs of 2017
- List of Billboard number-one rap singles of 2017
