= List of number-one R&B/hip-hop songs of 2017 (U.S.) =

This page lists the songs that reached number-one on the overall Hot R&B/Hip-Hop Songs chart, the R&B Songs chart (which was created in 2012), and the Hot Rap Songs chart in 2017. The R&B Songs and Rap Songs charts partly serve as distillations of the overall R&B/Hip-Hop Songs chart.

== List of number ones ==
Key
†	Indicates best-charting R&B/Hip-Hop, R&B, Rap and Airplay singles of 2017

Issue date	R&B/Hip-Hop Songs	Artist	R&B Songs	Artist	Rap Songs	Artist	R&B/Hip-Hop Airplay	Artist	Refs.
January 7	"Starboy"	The Weeknd featuring Daft Punk	"Starboy"	The Weeknd featuring Daft Punk	"Black Beatles"	Rae Sremmurd featuring Gucci Mane	"Black Beatles"	Rae Sremmurd featuring Gucci Mane	
January 14	"Black Beatles"	Rae Sremmurd featuring Gucci Mane	"Starboy"	The Weeknd featuring Daft Punk	"Black Beatles"	Rae Sremmurd featuring Gucci Mane	"Black Beatles"	Rae Sremmurd featuring Gucci Mane	
January 21	"Bad and Boujee"	Migos featuring Lil Uzi Vert	"Starboy"	The Weeknd featuring Daft Punk	"Bad and Boujee"	Migos featuring Lil Uzi Vert	"Black Beatles"	Rae Sremmurd featuring Gucci Mane	
January 28	"Bad and Boujee"	Migos featuring Lil Uzi Vert	"Starboy"	The Weeknd featuring Daft Punk	"Bad and Boujee"	Migos featuring Lil Uzi Vert	"Black Beatles"	Rae Sremmurd featuring Gucci Mane	
February 4	"Bad and Boujee"	Migos featuring Lil Uzi Vert	"Starboy"	The Weeknd featuring Daft Punk	"Bad and Boujee"	Migos featuring Lil Uzi Vert	"Fake Love"	Drake	
February 11	"Bad and Boujee"	Migos featuring Lil Uzi Vert	"Starboy"	The Weeknd featuring Daft Punk	"Bad and Boujee"	Migos featuring Lil Uzi Vert	"Fake Love"	Drake	
February 18	"Bad and Boujee"	Migos featuring Lil Uzi Vert	"Starboy"	The Weeknd featuring Daft Punk	"Bad and Boujee"	Migos featuring Lil Uzi Vert	"Fake Love"	Drake	
February 25	"Bad and Boujee"	Migos featuring Lil Uzi Vert	"Starboy"	The Weeknd featuring Daft Punk	"Bad and Boujee"	Migos featuring Lil Uzi Vert	"Bad and Boujee"	Migos featuring Lil Uzi Vert	
March 4	"Bad and Boujee"	Migos featuring Lil Uzi Vert	"That's What I Like" †	Bruno Mars	"Bad and Boujee"	Migos featuring Lil Uzi Vert	"Bad and Boujee"	Migos featuring Lil Uzi Vert	
March 11	"Bad and Boujee"	Migos featuring Lil Uzi Vert	"That's What I Like" †	Bruno Mars	"Bad and Boujee"	Migos featuring Lil Uzi Vert	"Bad and Boujee"	Migos featuring Lil Uzi Vert	
March 18	"Bad and Boujee"	Migos featuring Lil Uzi Vert	"That's What I Like" †	Bruno Mars	"Bad and Boujee"	Migos featuring Lil Uzi Vert	"Bad and Boujee"	Migos featuring Lil Uzi Vert	
March 25	"Bad and Boujee"	Migos featuring Lil Uzi Vert	"That's What I Like" †	Bruno Mars	"Bad and Boujee"	Migos featuring Lil Uzi Vert	"Bad and Boujee"	Migos featuring Lil Uzi Vert	
April 1	"That's What I Like" †	Bruno Mars	"That's What I Like" †	Bruno Mars	"Bad and Boujee"	Migos featuring Lil Uzi Vert	"Bad and Boujee"	Migos featuring Lil Uzi Vert	
April 8	"That's What I Like" †	Bruno Mars	"That's What I Like" †	Bruno Mars	"Bad and Boujee"	Migos featuring Lil Uzi Vert	"Bad and Boujee"	Migos featuring Lil Uzi Vert	
April 15	"That's What I Like" †	Bruno Mars	"That's What I Like" †	Bruno Mars	"ISpy"	Kyle featuring Lil Yachty	"Bad and Boujee"	Migos featuring Lil Uzi Vert	
April 22	"Humble"	Kendrick Lamar	"That's What I Like" †	Bruno Mars	"Humble" †	Kendrick Lamar	"Bad and Boujee"	Migos featuring Lil Uzi Vert	
April 29	"That's What I Like" †	Bruno Mars	"That's What I Like" †	Bruno Mars	"Humble" †	Kendrick Lamar	"Both"	Gucci Mane featuring Drake	
May 6	"Humble"	Kendrick Lamar	"That's What I Like" †	Bruno Mars	"Humble" †	Kendrick Lamar	"Both"	Gucci Mane featuring Drake	
May 13	"That's What I Like" †	Bruno Mars	"That's What I Like" †	Bruno Mars	"Humble" †	Kendrick Lamar	"Mask Off"	Future	
May 20	"I'm the One"	DJ Khaled featuring Justin Bieber, Quavo, Chance the Rapper and Lil Wayne	"That's What I Like" †	Bruno Mars	"I'm the One"	DJ Khaled featuring Justin Bieber, Quavo, Chance the Rapper and Lil Wayne	"Mask Off"	Future	
May 27	"That's What I Like" †	Bruno Mars	"That's What I Like" †	Bruno Mars	"I'm the One"	DJ Khaled featuring Justin Bieber, Quavo, Chance the Rapper and Lil Wayne	"Mask Off"	Future	
June 3	"That's What I Like" †	Bruno Mars	"That's What I Like" †	Bruno Mars	"I'm the One"	DJ Khaled featuring Justin Bieber, Quavo, Chance the Rapper and Lil Wayne	"That's What I Like" †	Bruno Mars	
June 10	"That's What I Like" †	Bruno Mars	"That's What I Like" †	Bruno Mars	"I'm the One"	DJ Khaled featuring Justin Bieber, Quavo, Chance the Rapper and Lil Wayne	"That's What I Like" †	Bruno Mars	
June 17	"That's What I Like" †	Bruno Mars	"That's What I Like" †	Bruno Mars	"I'm the One"	DJ Khaled featuring Justin Bieber, Quavo, Chance the Rapper and Lil Wayne	"That's What I Like" †	Bruno Mars	
June 24	"That's What I Like" †	Bruno Mars	"That's What I Like" †	Bruno Mars	"I'm the One"	DJ Khaled featuring Justin Bieber, Quavo, Chance the Rapper and Lil Wayne	"That's What I Like" †	Bruno Mars	
July 1	"I'm the One"	DJ Khaled featuring Justin Bieber, Quavo, Chance the Rapper and Lil Wayne	"That's What I Like" †	Bruno Mars	"I'm the One"	DJ Khaled featuring Justin Bieber, Quavo, Chance the Rapper and Lil Wayne	"That's What I Like" †	Bruno Mars	
July 8	"I'm the One"	DJ Khaled featuring Justin Bieber, Quavo, Chance the Rapper and Lil Wayne	"That's What I Like" †	Bruno Mars	"I'm the One"	DJ Khaled featuring Justin Bieber, Quavo, Chance the Rapper and Lil Wayne	"That's What I Like" †	Bruno Mars	
July 15	"I'm the One"	DJ Khaled featuring Justin Bieber, Quavo, Chance the Rapper and Lil Wayne	"Wild Thoughts"	DJ Khaled featuring Rihanna and Bryson Tiller	"I'm the One"	DJ Khaled featuring Justin Bieber, Quavo, Chance the Rapper and Lil Wayne	"That's What I Like" †	Bruno Mars	
July 22	"I'm the One"	DJ Khaled featuring Justin Bieber, Quavo, Chance the Rapper and Lil Wayne	"That's What I Like" †	Bruno Mars	"I'm the One"	DJ Khaled featuring Justin Bieber, Quavo, Chance the Rapper and Lil Wayne	"That's What I Like" †	Bruno Mars	
July 29	"Wild Thoughts"	DJ Khaled featuring Rihanna and Bryson Tiller	"Wild Thoughts"	DJ Khaled featuring Rihanna and Bryson Tiller	"I'm the One"	DJ Khaled featuring Justin Bieber, Quavo, Chance the Rapper and Lil Wayne	"That's What I Like" †	Bruno Mars	
August 5	"Wild Thoughts"	DJ Khaled featuring Rihanna and Bryson Tiller	"Wild Thoughts"	DJ Khaled featuring Rihanna and Bryson Tiller	"I'm the One"	DJ Khaled featuring Justin Bieber, Quavo, Chance the Rapper and Lil Wayne	"That's What I Like" †	Bruno Mars	
August 12	"Wild Thoughts"	DJ Khaled featuring Rihanna and Bryson Tiller	"Wild Thoughts"	DJ Khaled featuring Rihanna and Bryson Tiller	"I'm the One"	DJ Khaled featuring Justin Bieber, Quavo, Chance the Rapper and Lil Wayne	"That's What I Like" †	Bruno Mars	
August 19	"Wild Thoughts"	DJ Khaled featuring Rihanna and Bryson Tiller	"Wild Thoughts"	DJ Khaled featuring Rihanna and Bryson Tiller	"Unforgettable"	French Montana featuring Swae Lee	"That's What I Like" †	Bruno Mars	
August 26	"Wild Thoughts"	DJ Khaled featuring Rihanna and Bryson Tiller	"Wild Thoughts"	DJ Khaled featuring Rihanna and Bryson Tiller	"Unforgettable"	French Montana featuring Swae Lee	"Wild Thoughts"	DJ Khaled featuring Rihanna and Bryson Tiller	
September 2	"Wild Thoughts"	DJ Khaled featuring Rihanna and Bryson Tiller	"Wild Thoughts"	DJ Khaled featuring Rihanna and Bryson Tiller	"Bodak Yellow"	Cardi B	"Wild Thoughts"	DJ Khaled featuring Rihanna and Bryson Tiller	
September 9	"Wild Thoughts"	DJ Khaled featuring Rihanna and Bryson Tiller	"Wild Thoughts"	DJ Khaled featuring Rihanna and Bryson Tiller	"Bodak Yellow"	Cardi B	"Wild Thoughts"	DJ Khaled featuring Rihanna and Bryson Tiller	
September 16	"Bodak Yellow"	Cardi B	"Wild Thoughts"	DJ Khaled featuring Rihanna and Bryson Tiller	"Bodak Yellow"	Cardi B	"Wild Thoughts"	DJ Khaled featuring Rihanna and Bryson Tiller	
September 23	"Bodak Yellow"	Cardi B	"Wild Thoughts"	DJ Khaled featuring Rihanna and Bryson Tiller	"Bodak Yellow"	Cardi B	"Wild Thoughts"	DJ Khaled featuring Rihanna and Bryson Tiller	
September 30	"Bodak Yellow"	Cardi B	"Wild Thoughts"	DJ Khaled featuring Rihanna and Bryson Tiller	"Bodak Yellow"	Cardi B	"Bodak Yellow"	Cardi B	
October 7	"Bodak Yellow"	Cardi B	"Wild Thoughts"	DJ Khaled featuring Rihanna and Bryson Tiller	"Bodak Yellow"	Cardi B	"Bodak Yellow"	Cardi B	
October 14	"Bodak Yellow"	Cardi B	"Wild Thoughts"	DJ Khaled featuring Rihanna and Bryson Tiller	"Bodak Yellow"	Cardi B	"Bodak Yellow"	Cardi B	
October 21	"Bodak Yellow"	Cardi B	"Wild Thoughts"	DJ Khaled featuring Rihanna and Bryson Tiller	"Bodak Yellow"	Cardi B	"Bodak Yellow"	Cardi B	
October 28	"Rockstar"	Post Malone featuring 21 Savage	"Wild Thoughts"	DJ Khaled featuring Rihanna and Bryson Tiller	"Rockstar"	Post Malone featuring 21 Savage	"Bodak Yellow"	Cardi B	
November 4	"Rockstar"	Post Malone featuring 21 Savage	"Young Dumb & Broke"	Khalid	"Rockstar"	Post Malone featuring 21 Savage	"Bodak Yellow"	Cardi B	
November 11	"Rockstar"	Post Malone featuring 21 Savage	"Young Dumb & Broke"	Khalid	"Rockstar"	Post Malone featuring 21 Savage	"Bodak Yellow"	Cardi B	
November 18	"Rockstar"	Post Malone featuring 21 Savage	"Young Dumb & Broke"	Khalid	"Rockstar"	Post Malone featuring 21 Savage	"Bodak Yellow"	Cardi B	
November 25	"Rockstar"	Post Malone featuring 21 Savage	"Young Dumb & Broke"	Khalid	"Rockstar"	Post Malone featuring 21 Savage	"Bodak Yellow"	Cardi B	
December 2	"Rockstar"	Post Malone featuring 21 Savage	"Young Dumb & Broke"	Khalid	"Rockstar"	Post Malone featuring 21 Savage	"Bodak Yellow"	Cardi B	
December 9	"Rockstar"	Post Malone featuring 21 Savage	"Young Dumb & Broke"	Khalid	"Rockstar"	Post Malone featuring 21 Savage	"Rockstar"	Post Malone featuring 21 Savage	
December 16	"Rockstar"	Post Malone featuring 21 Savage	"Young Dumb & Broke"	Khalid	"Rockstar"	Post Malone featuring 21 Savage	"Rockstar"	Post Malone featuring 21 Savage	
December 23	"Rockstar"	Post Malone featuring 21 Savage	"Young Dumb & Broke"	Khalid	"Rockstar"	Post Malone featuring 21 Savage	"No Limit"	G-Eazy featuring Cardi B and ASAP Rocky	
December 30	"Rockstar"	Post Malone featuring 21 Savage	"Young Dumb & Broke"	Khalid	"Rockstar"	Post Malone featuring 21 Savage	"No Limit"	G-Eazy featuring Cardi B and ASAP Rocky	

== See also ==
- Billboard Year-End Hot R&B/Hip-Hop Songs of 2017
- List of Billboard Hot 100 number-one singles of 2017
- List of Billboard number-one R&B/hip-hop albums of 2017
