= List of Billboard number-one R&B/hip-hop albums of 2017 =

This page lists the albums that reached number-one on the overall Top R&B/Hip-Hop Albums chart, the R&B Albums chart (which was re-created in 2013), and the Rap Albums chart in 2017. The R&B Albums and Rap Albums charts partly serve as distillations of the overall R&B/Hip-Hop Albums chart.

Note that Billboard publishes charts with an issue date approximately 7–10 days in advance.

== List of number ones ==
Key
†	Indicates best-charting R&B/Hip-Hop, R&B and Rap albums of 2017

Issue date	R&B/Hip-Hop Albums	Artist(s)	R&B Albums	Artist(s)	Rap Albums	Artist(s)	Refs.
January 7	24K Magic	Bruno Mars	24K Magic †	Bruno Mars	4 Your Eyez Only	J. Cole	
January 14	24K Magic	Bruno Mars	24K Magic †	Bruno Mars	4 Your Eyez Only	J. Cole	
January 21	24K Magic	Bruno Mars	24K Magic †	Bruno Mars	Hamilton: An American Musical	Original Broadway Cast	
January 28	24K Magic	Bruno Mars	24K Magic †	Bruno Mars	Hamilton: An American Musical	Original Broadway Cast	
February 4	Run the Jewels 3	Run the Jewels	24K Magic †	Bruno Mars	Run the Jewels 3	Run the Jewels	
February 11	Starboy	The Weeknd	Starboy	The Weeknd	Stoney	Post Malone	
February 18	Culture	Migos	SweetSexySavage	Kehlani	Culture	Migos	
February 25	I Decided.	Big Sean	Starboy	The Weeknd	I Decided.	Big Sean	
March 4	24K Magic	Bruno Mars	24K Magic †	Bruno Mars	I Decided.	Big Sean	
March 11	Future	Future	24K Magic †	Bruno Mars	Future	Future	
March 18	Hndrxx	Future	24K Magic †	Bruno Mars	Hndrxx	Future	
March 25	24K Magic	Bruno Mars	24K Magic †	Bruno Mars	Future	Future	
April 1	24K Magic	Bruno Mars	24K Magic †	Bruno Mars	Future	Future	
April 8	More Life	Drake	24K Magic †	Bruno Mars	More Life	Drake	
April 15	More Life	Drake	Tremaine the Album	Trey Songz	More Life	Drake	
April 22	More Life	Drake	24K Magic †	Bruno Mars	More Life	Drake	
April 29	More Life	Drake	24K Magic †	Bruno Mars	More Life	Drake	
May 6	Damn †	Kendrick Lamar	24K Magic †	Bruno Mars	Damn †	Kendrick Lamar	
May 13	Damn †	Kendrick Lamar	24K Magic †	Bruno Mars	Damn †	Kendrick Lamar	
May 20	Damn †	Kendrick Lamar	Strength of a Woman	Mary J. Blige	Damn †	Kendrick Lamar	
May 27	Everybody	Logic	24K Magic †	Bruno Mars	Everybody	Logic	
June 3	Damn †	Kendrick Lamar	24K Magic †	Bruno Mars	Damn †	Kendrick Lamar	
June 10	Damn †	Kendrick Lamar	24K Magic †	Bruno Mars	Damn †	Kendrick Lamar	
June 17	True to Self	Bryson Tiller	True to Self	Bryson Tiller	Damn †	Kendrick Lamar	
June 24	Damn †	Kendrick Lamar	24K Magic †	Bruno Mars	Damn †	Kendrick Lamar	
July 1	Damn †	Kendrick Lamar	Ctrl	SZA	Damn †	Kendrick Lamar	
July 8	Pretty Girls Like Trap Music	2 Chainz	24K Magic †	Bruno Mars	Pretty Girls Like Trap Music	2 Chainz	
July 15	Grateful	DJ Khaled	Purple Rain	Prince	Grateful	DJ Khaled	
July 22	Grateful	DJ Khaled	24K Magic †	Bruno Mars	Grateful	DJ Khaled	
July 29	4:44	Jay-Z	24K Magic †	Bruno Mars	4:44	Jay-Z	
August 5	4:44	Jay-Z	American Teen	Khalid	4:44	Jay-Z	
August 12	Flower Boy	Tyler, The Creator	American Teen	Khalid	Flower Boy	Tyler, The Creator	
August 19	Damn †	Kendrick Lamar	American Teen	Khalid	Damn †	Kendrick Lamar	
August 26	Damn †	Kendrick Lamar	Ctrl	SZA	Damn †	Kendrick Lamar	
September 2	Damn †	Kendrick Lamar	American Teen	Khalid	Damn †	Kendrick Lamar	
September 9	Project Baby 2	Kodak Black	American Teen	Khalid	Project Baby 2	Kodak Black	
September 16	Luv Is Rage 2	Lil Uzi Vert	17	XXXTentacion	Luv Is Rage 2	Lil Uzi Vert	
September 23	Luv Is Rage 2	Lil Uzi Vert	17	XXXTentacion	Luv Is Rage 2	Lil Uzi Vert	
September 30	Luv Is Rage 2	Lil Uzi Vert	17	XXXTentacion	Luv Is Rage 2	Lil Uzi Vert	
October 7	Luv Is Rage 2	Lil Uzi Vert	17	XXXTentacion	Luv Is Rage 2	Lil Uzi Vert	
October 14	Gemini	Macklemore	Trip	Jhené Aiko	Gemini	Macklemore	
October 21	The Bigger Artist	A Boogie wit da Hoodie	American Teen	Khalid	The Bigger Artist	A Boogie wit da Hoodie	
October 28	Perception	NF	American Teen	Khalid	Perception	NF	
November 4	Mr. Davis	Gucci Mane	American Teen	Khalid	Mr. Davis	Gucci Mane	
November 11	Super Slimey	Future and Young Thug	American Teen	Khalid	Super Slimey	Future and Young Thug	
November 18	Heartbreak on a Full Moon	Chris Brown	Heartbreak on a Full Moon	Chris Brown	Without Warning	21 Savage, Offset and Metro Boomin	
November 25	Heartbreak on a Full Moon	Chris Brown	Heartbreak on a Full Moon	Chris Brown	Without Warning	21 Savage, Offset and Metro Boomin	
December 2	Heartbreak on a Full Moon	Chris Brown	Heartbreak on a Full Moon	Chris Brown	Stoney	Post Malone	
December 9	Luv Is Rage 2	Lil Uzi Vert	Heartbreak on a Full Moon	Chris Brown	Luv Is Rage 2	Lil Uzi Vert	
December 16	Stoney	Post Malone	Heartbreak on a Full Moon	Chris Brown	Stoney	Post Malone	
December 23	War & Leisure	Miguel	War & Leisure	Miguel	Stoney	Post Malone	
December 30	Quality Control: Control the Streets Volume 1	Quality Control	Heartbreak on a Full Moon	Chris Brown	Quality Control: Control the Streets Volume 1	Quality Control	

== See also ==
- 2017 in music
- List of Billboard 200 number-one albums of 2017
- List of number-one R&B/hip-hop songs of 2017 (U.S.)
