= List of Billboard Hot 100 number ones of 2017 =

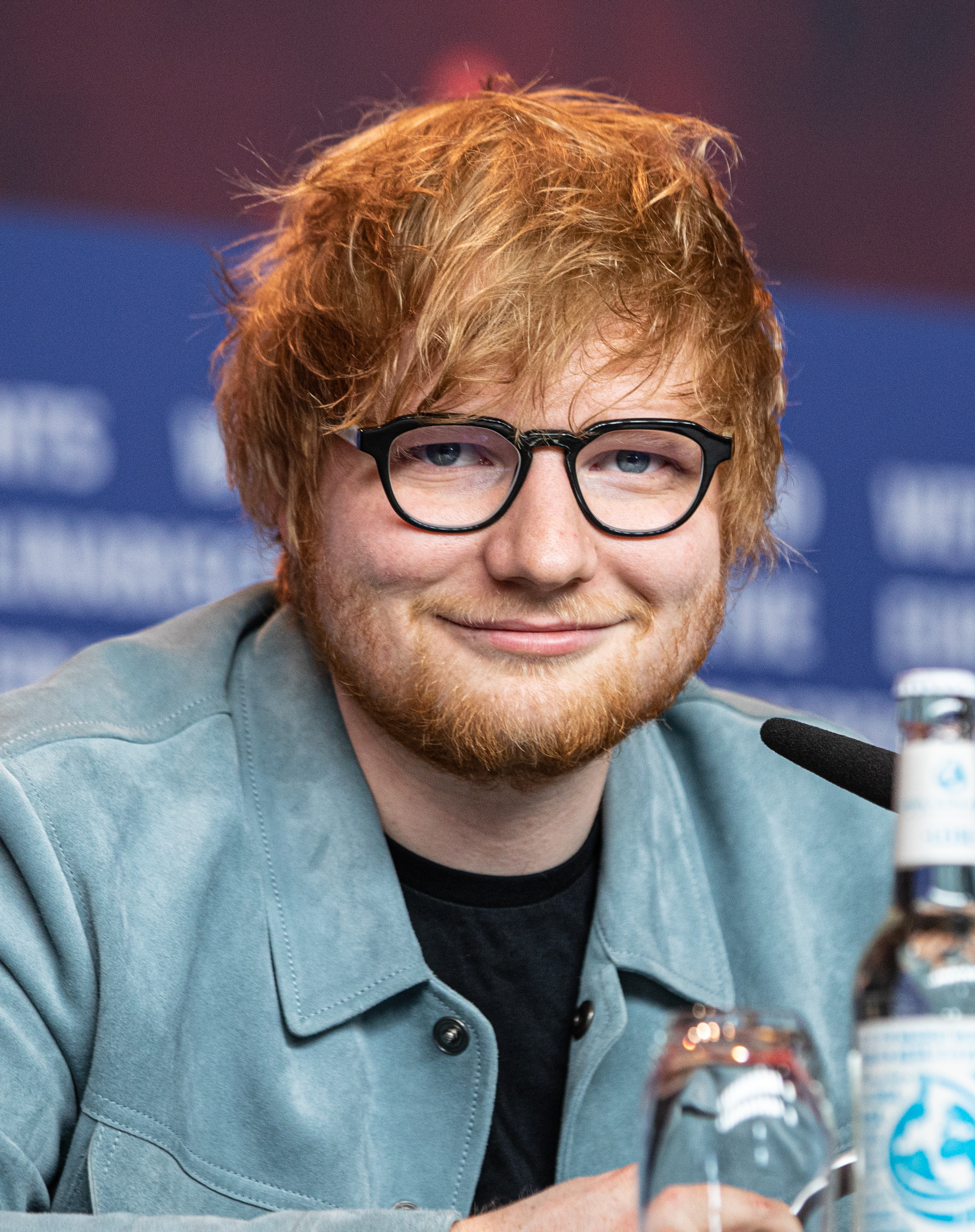
Ed Sheeran (pictured) scored two number-one singles with "Shape of You" and "Perfect". The former became the number-one song on the Billboard Year-End Hot 100 of 2017.

The Billboard Hot 100 is a chart that ranks the best-performing songs in the United States. Its data, published by Billboard magazine and compiled by Nielsen SoundScan, is based collectively on each song's weekly physical and digital sales, as well as the amount of airplay received on American radio stations and streaming on online digital music outlets.

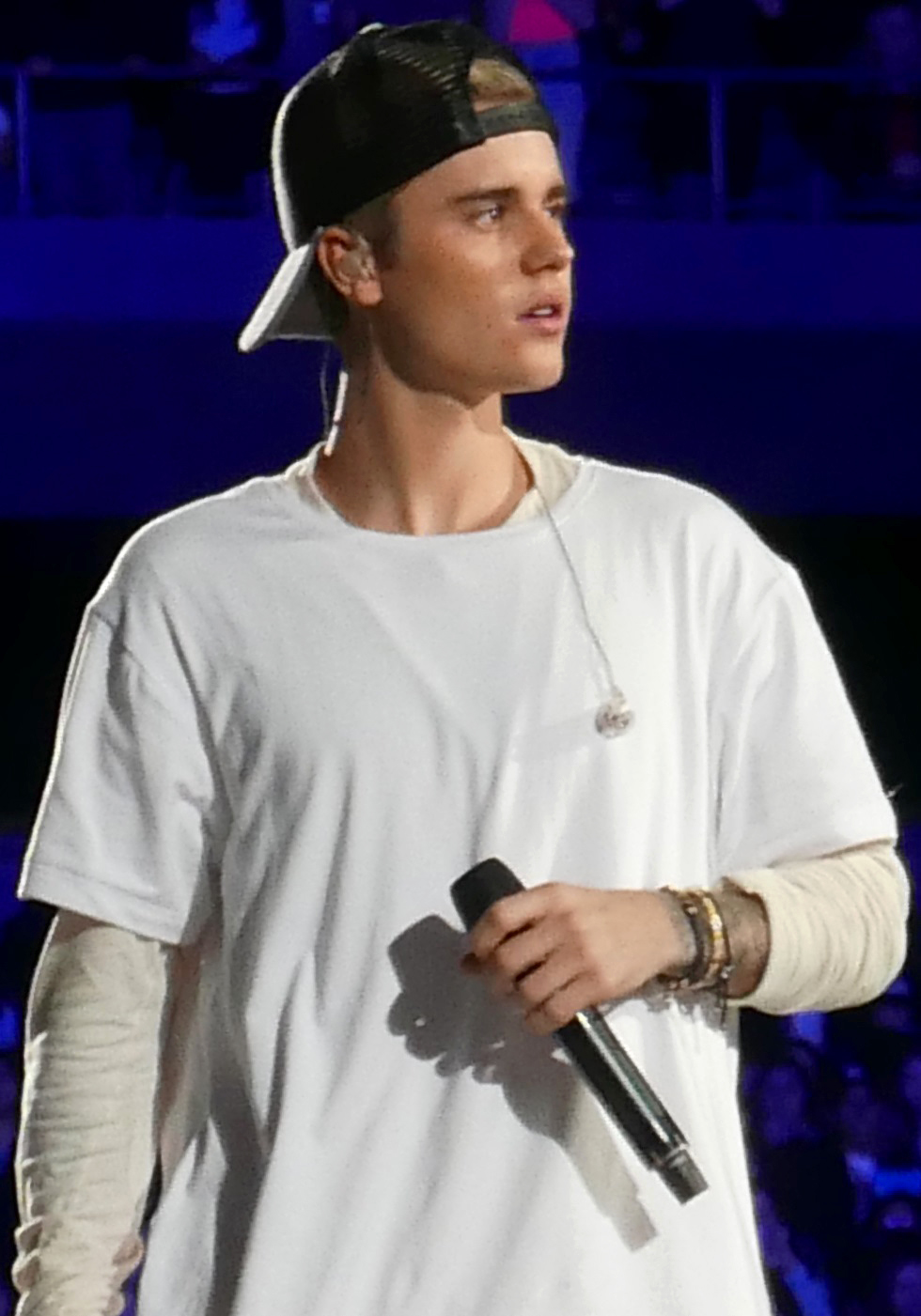
Justin Bieber (pictured) earned his fourth and fifth number-one singles with "I'm The One" and "Despacito" while becoming the first artist ever to obtain new number-one hits in consecutive weeks in Billboard Hot 100 history.

During 2017, eleven singles reached number one on the Hot 100; a twelfth single, "Black Beatles" by Rae Sremmurd featuring Gucci Mane, began its run at number one in November 2016. Of those eleven number-one singles, six were collaborations. In total, nineteen acts topped the chart as either lead or featured artists, with twelve—Daft Punk, Migos, Lil Uzi Vert, Ed Sheeran, DJ Khaled, Quavo (as a solo act), Chance the Rapper, Luis Fonsi, Daddy Yankee, Cardi B, Post Malone, and 21 Savage—achieving their first Hot 100 number-one single. "Despacito" by Luis Fonsi and Daddy Yankee featuring Justin Bieber was the longest-running number-one of the year, leading the chart for sixteen weeks and tying the then-record for longest-running number-one single in the history of the chart; despite this, Ed Sheeran's "Shape of You" topped the Billboard Year-End Hot 100.

Ed Sheeran and Justin Bieber were the only acts to have multiple number ones, with both gaining two.

== Chart history ==
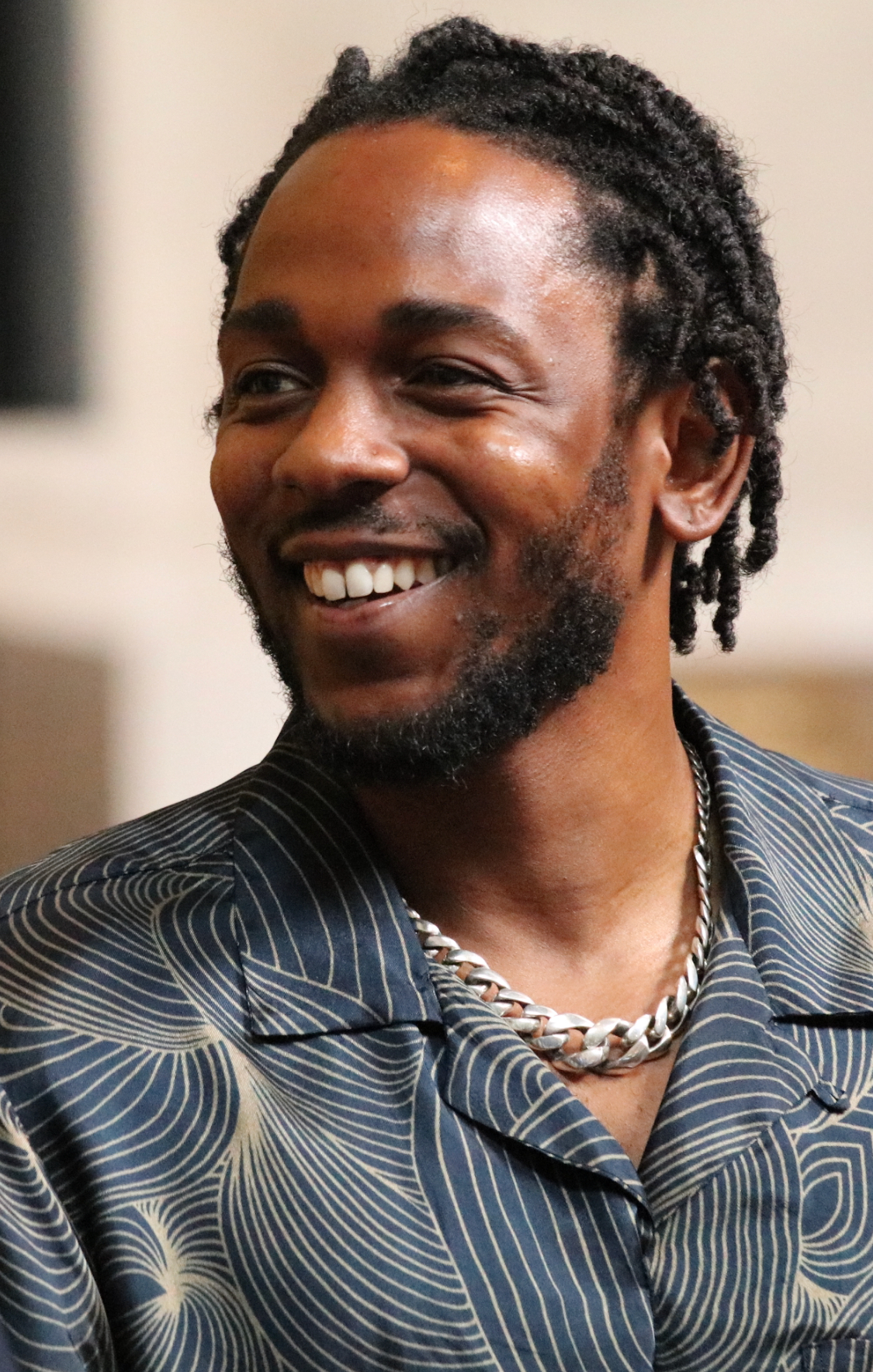
Kendrick Lamar (pictured) scored his first number-one hit as a lead artist with "Humble".

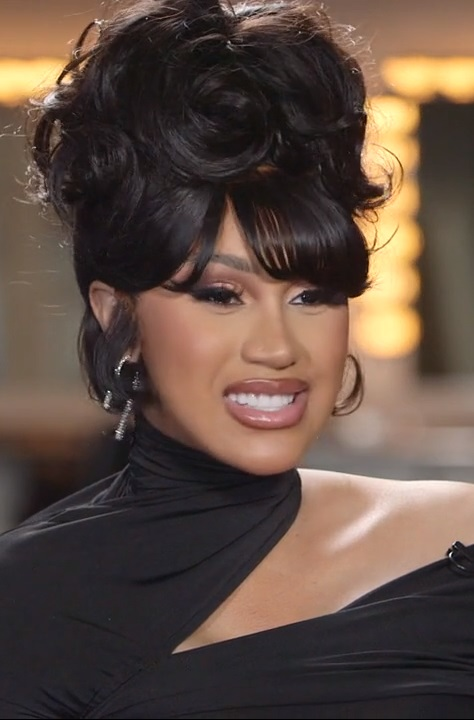
Cardi B (pictured) became the first solo female rapper to reach number one on the chart with "Bodak Yellow" since Lauryn Hill's "Doo Wop (That Thing)" in 1998.

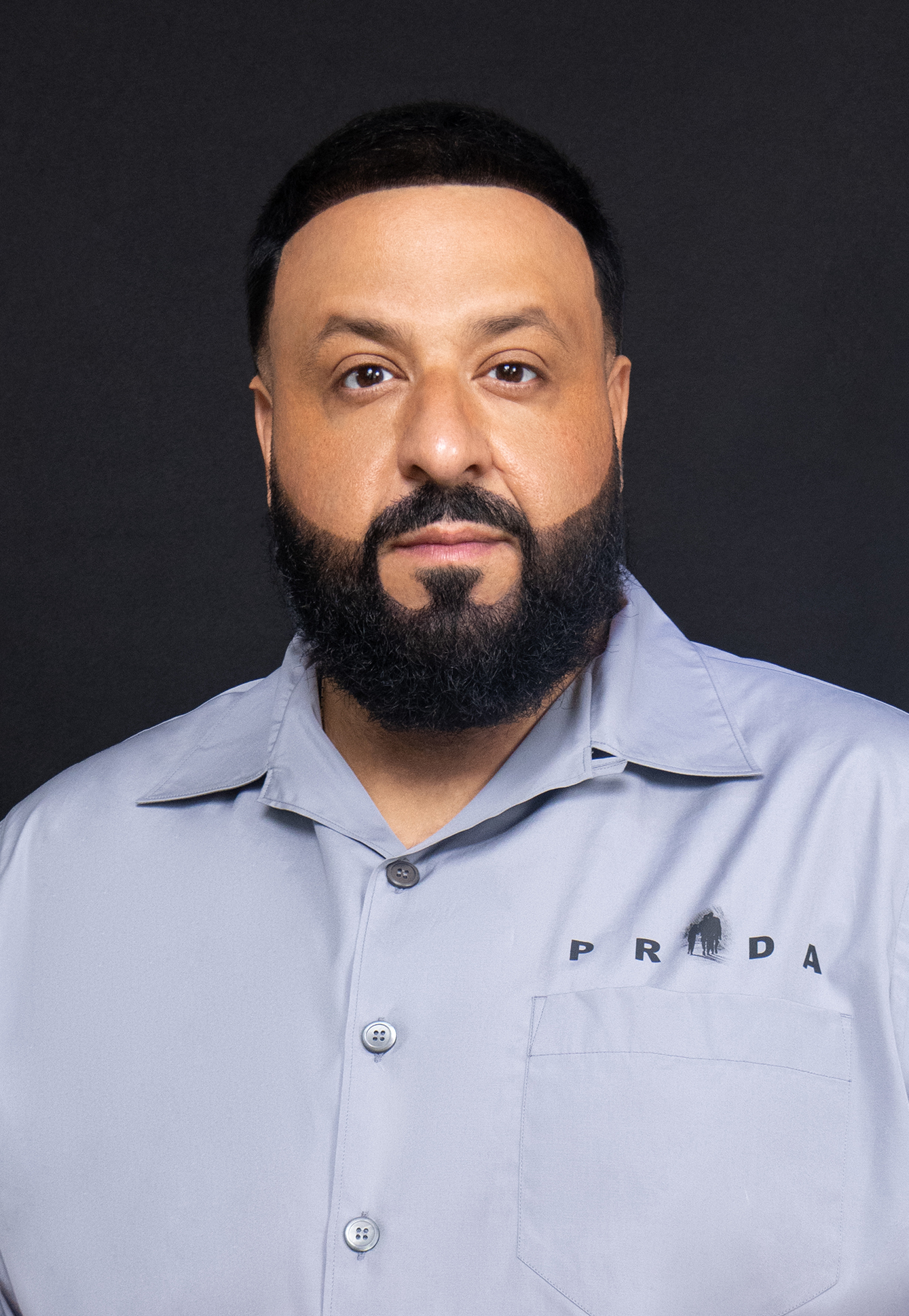
"I'm the One" by DJ Khaled (pictured) became the twenty-eighth song to debut at number one, and the third collaboration to do so.

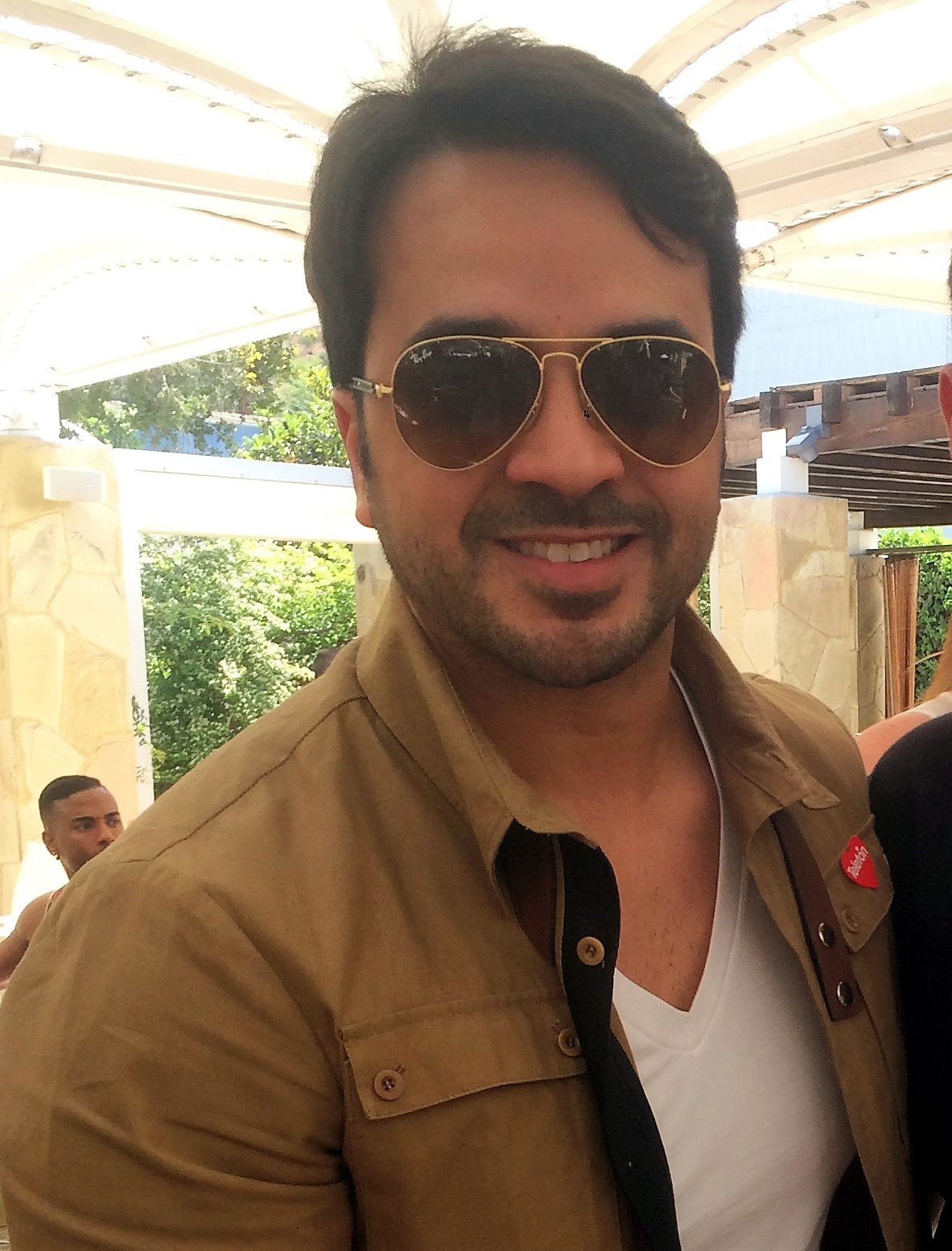
"Despacito" by Puerto Rican artist Luis Fonsi (pictured) became the first foreign-language song to reach number-one since 1996, and tied Mariah Carey’s record for sixteen weeks atop the Hot 100.

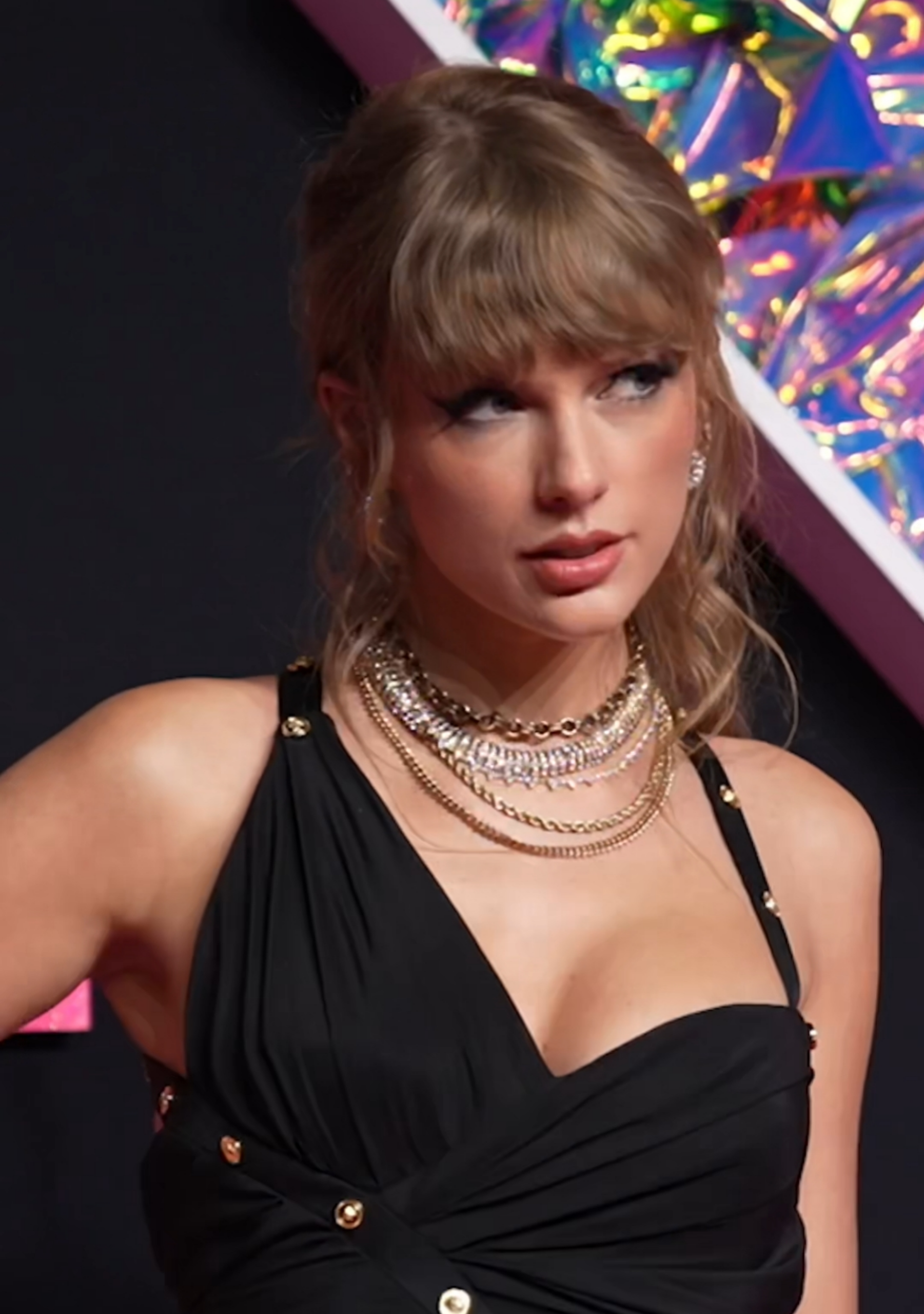
Taylor Swift (pictured) earned her fifth number one single with "Look What You Made Me Do".

Key
†	Indicates best-performing single of 2017

No.	Issue date	Song	Artist(s)	Ref.
1059	January 7	"Starboy"	The Weeknd featuring Daft Punk	
re	January 14	"Black Beatles"	Rae Sremmurd featuring Gucci Mane	
1060	January 21	"Bad and Boujee"	Migos featuring Lil Uzi Vert	
1061	January 28	"Shape of You" †	Ed Sheeran	
re	February 4	"Bad and Boujee"	Migos featuring Lil Uzi Vert	
re	February 11	"Bad and Boujee"	Migos featuring Lil Uzi Vert	
re	February 18	"Shape of You" †	Ed Sheeran	
re	February 25	"Shape of You" †	Ed Sheeran	
re	March 4	"Shape of You" †	Ed Sheeran	
re	March 11	"Shape of You" †	Ed Sheeran	
re	March 18	"Shape of You" †	Ed Sheeran	
re	March 25	"Shape of You" †	Ed Sheeran	
re	April 1	"Shape of You" †	Ed Sheeran	
re	April 8	"Shape of You" †	Ed Sheeran	
re	April 15	"Shape of You" †	Ed Sheeran	
re	April 22	"Shape of You" †	Ed Sheeran	
re	April 29	"Shape of You" †	Ed Sheeran	
1062	May 6	"Humble"	Kendrick Lamar	
1063	May 13	"That's What I Like"	Bruno Mars	
1064	May 20	"I'm the One"	DJ Khaled featuring Justin Bieber, Quavo, Chance the Rapper and Lil Wayne	
1065	May 27	"Despacito"	Luis Fonsi and Daddy Yankee featuring Justin Bieber	
1065	June 3	"Despacito"	Luis Fonsi and Daddy Yankee featuring Justin Bieber	
1065	June 10	"Despacito"	Luis Fonsi and Daddy Yankee featuring Justin Bieber	
1065	June 17	"Despacito"	Luis Fonsi and Daddy Yankee featuring Justin Bieber	
1065	June 24	"Despacito"	Luis Fonsi and Daddy Yankee featuring Justin Bieber	
1065	July 1	"Despacito"	Luis Fonsi and Daddy Yankee featuring Justin Bieber	
1065	July 8	"Despacito"	Luis Fonsi and Daddy Yankee featuring Justin Bieber	
1065	July 15	"Despacito"	Luis Fonsi and Daddy Yankee featuring Justin Bieber	
1065	July 22	"Despacito"	Luis Fonsi and Daddy Yankee featuring Justin Bieber	
1065	July 29	"Despacito"	Luis Fonsi and Daddy Yankee featuring Justin Bieber	
1065	August 5	"Despacito"	Luis Fonsi and Daddy Yankee featuring Justin Bieber	
1065	August 12	"Despacito"	Luis Fonsi and Daddy Yankee featuring Justin Bieber	
1065	August 19	"Despacito"	Luis Fonsi and Daddy Yankee featuring Justin Bieber	
1065	August 26	"Despacito"	Luis Fonsi and Daddy Yankee featuring Justin Bieber	
1065	September 2	"Despacito"	Luis Fonsi and Daddy Yankee featuring Justin Bieber	
1065	September 9	"Despacito"	Luis Fonsi and Daddy Yankee featuring Justin Bieber	
1066	September 16	"Look What You Made Me Do"	Taylor Swift	
1066	September 23	"Look What You Made Me Do"	Taylor Swift	
1066	September 30	"Look What You Made Me Do"	Taylor Swift	
1067	October 7	"Bodak Yellow"	Cardi B	
1067	October 14	"Bodak Yellow"	Cardi B	
1067	October 21	"Bodak Yellow"	Cardi B	
1068	October 28	"Rockstar"	Post Malone featuring 21 Savage	
1068	November 4	"Rockstar"	Post Malone featuring 21 Savage	
1068	November 11	"Rockstar"	Post Malone featuring 21 Savage	
1068	November 18	"Rockstar"	Post Malone featuring 21 Savage	
1068	November 25	"Rockstar"	Post Malone featuring 21 Savage	
1068	December 2	"Rockstar"	Post Malone featuring 21 Savage	
1068	December 9	"Rockstar"	Post Malone featuring 21 Savage	
1068	December 16	"Rockstar"	Post Malone featuring 21 Savage	
1069	December 23	"Perfect"	Ed Sheeran and Beyoncé	
1069	December 30	"Perfect"	Ed Sheeran and Beyoncé	

== Number-one artists ==
List of number-one artists by total weeks at number one
Position	Artist	Weeks at No. 1
1	Justin Bieber	17
2	Luis Fonsi	16
2	Daddy Yankee	16
4	Ed Sheeran	14
5	Post Malone	8
5	21 Savage	8
7	Migos	3
7	Lil Uzi Vert	3
7	Taylor Swift	3
7	Cardi B	3
11	Beyoncé	2
12	The Weeknd	1
12	Daft Punk	1
12	Rae Sremmurd	1
12	Gucci Mane	1
12	Kendrick Lamar	1
12	Bruno Mars	1
12	DJ Khaled	1
12	Quavo	1
12	Chance the Rapper	1
12	Lil Wayne	1

== See also ==
- 2017 in American music
- List of Billboard 200 number-one albums of 2017
- List of Billboard Hot 100 top-ten singles in 2017
- Billboard Year-End Hot 100 singles of 2017
- List of Billboard Hot 100 number-one singles of the 2010s
