= Humble (song) =

2017 single by Kendrick Lamar

Single by Kendrick Lamar

from the album Damn
- Released: March 30, 2017
- Recorded: 2016
- Genre: Hip-hop; trap
- Length: 2:57
- Label: Top Dawg Entertainment; Aftermath; Interscope
- Songwriters: Kendrick Duckworth; Michael Williams II; Asheton Hogan
- Producers: Mike Will Made It; Pluss

Kendrick Lamar singles chronology
"Walk on By" (2017)	"Humble" (2017)	"Perfect Pint" (2017)

Music video
- "Humble" on YouTube

Skrillex remix cover

"Humble" (stylized as "HUMBLE.") is a song by American rapper Kendrick Lamar. It was released on March 30, 2017, along with its music video, by Top Dawg Entertainment, Aftermath Entertainment and Interscope Records. The song was written by Lamar and producers Mike WiLL Made-It and Pluss. The lyrics are a call to humility. It was provided to rhythmic contemporary radio as the lead single from Lamar's fourth studio album, Damn.

"Humble" was Lamar's second number-one single on the US Billboard Hot 100, after "Bad Blood", and his first as a lead artist. The song received four nominations at the 60th Annual Grammy Awards: Record of the Year, Best Rap Performance, Best Rap Song, and Best Music Video, winning the last three categories. It was the top rap song in the U.S. for 2017, taking the top spot on the Billboard Year-End Hot Rap Songs of 2017.

== Recording ==
"Humble" was the first song to be recorded for Damn. The beat for "Humble" was developed by Mike Will Made It, with the intention of recording the song with Gucci Mane. However, the song was later shown to Lamar. After recording, it was initially agreed upon that it would be released on Mike Will Made's debut album Ransom 2, but others convinced Lamar to keep it for his upcoming album.

== Critical reception ==
On the day of its release Pitchfork named it Best New Track, noting that, " 'Humble' is a hard-nosed G check of his lessers, that pivots into imperfect critiques of beauty standards". NPR's Andrew Flanagan thought, "the song, less exploration of contrition on the part of Lamar than an instruction to his peers, picks up a thread NPR Music first examined following that album teaser: how the 'best rapper alive' might explore the theme of God, religion and personal growth." For Alex Young of Consequence of Sound, "it's got all the ingredients of a proper lead single: a Mike WiLL Made It-produced beat built on piano and 808 bass, a chorus you can spit along to ('Sit down/ Be humble'), and shoutouts to Grey Poupon and the former president." Writing for The Guardian, Harriet Gibson explained how the song is, "sparse and rigid, beginning with the crunching swipes of an electric guitar, and is led by beats and sinister stabs of piano. It is a showcase for his authoritative lyricism and preacher-like message, while the instrumentation is far from the complex jazz and funk sounds of To Pimp a Butterfly ... In fact, 'Humble' has more in common with grime's minimalism than it does the vintage stylings of his recent output."

Entertainment Weekly labelled it the best song of the year. Rolling Stone considered it the third-best, and Billboard the sixth. and in 2021, Rolling Stone ranked the song number eight on their list of the 50 greatest Kendrick Lamar songs.

== Chart performance ==
"Humble" debuted at number two and later peaked at number one on the US Billboard Hot 100, becoming Lamar's first number one and highest-charting single as a lead artist, surpassing "Swimming Pools (Drank)", which peaked at number 17 in 2012. It became his second number one single overall after "Bad Blood", by Taylor Swift featuring Lamar. It was also his fourth top 10 single, and marked the highest debut for a hip hop song since "Love the Way You Lie" by Eminem featuring Rihanna. Selling well over 111,000 copies in its first week, "Humble" became Kendrick Lamar's second number one on the Digital Songs chart, following "Bad Blood". The song was at number 1 on the Hot 100 for one week but was replaced by Bruno Mars's "That's What I Like" on May 1, 2017. The song spent its first 15 weeks in the top 10 of the Hot 100, before dropping to number 11 on the week dated August 5, 2017. "Humble" is the only rap song in 2017 to sell over 1,000,000 digital copies and it is certified 10× platinum in the United States.

The song also peaked at number one in New Zealand, number two in Australia (where it was later voted into first place in the Triple J Hottest 100, 2017) and Canada, and reached the top 10 in Ireland and the UK.

== Music video ==
Kendrick Lamar dressed in all white in contrast to the black-clothed people lit on fire around him.

Directed by Dave Meyers and The Little Homies and released on March 30, 2017, on Kendrick Lamar's Vevo account, the song's accompanying music video starts with Lamar dressed like the pope in a cope, before then showing Lamar in all black lying on a table of money, "ignorantly" shooting loads of bills from a cash cannon. It also features a reenactment of Leonardo da Vinci's 15th-century painting, The Last Supper, with Lamar sitting in Jesus' chair as his disciples "unappreciatively" gorge on wine and bread. He is also seen teeing off on top of a car, passing mustard between cars mimicking a Grey Poupon commercial and at one point the top of his head is in flames. Fellow Top Dawg Entertainment rapper Jay Rock and producer Sounwave appear in the video alongside other TDE members.

The music video also changed the intro lines from "Nobody pray for me/It been that day for me" to "Wicked or weakness/You gotta see this".

Reviewing the music video, Billboard editor Brad Wete thought it "is a poignant exercise in irony and is also filled with messaging that could be perceived as anti-conformist." He concluded saying "His raps are filterless; he tells it like it is. So it's no surprise that this dynamic video is essentially what Lamar is as an artist: balanced with a clear message." Althea Legaspi of Rolling Stone described it as "richly symbolic." For Harriet Gibson of The Guardian, "the brilliantly cinematic video, with its fish-eye lens and cartoonish stylising, recalls classic Hype Williams, and leads the viewer through these passages of assignation, fleshing out Lamar's ideas. It breathes life into a song that would hardly be considered his greatest creation, but neatly lays out a mood of intent." Matt Miller of Esquire opined about the rapper's videography: "in recent years, Kendrick Lamar has revived the music video as a powerful form of social commentary."

Nominated for eight categories at the 2017 MTV Video Music Awards, "Humble" won six, including Video of the Year.

== Usage in media ==
ESPN and ABC used the song, along with "DNA" and "Loyalty", as their lead song for their NBA Playoff coverage in 2017.

The 21st season premiere of South Park, "White People Renovating Houses", featured a character performing the song in a country-style parody. The song is also heard in other television shows such as Skam and Black-ish.

"Humble" is featured and remixed in YouTube Rewind: The Shape of 2017. "Humble" is also featured on NBA 2K18’s in-game soundtrack.

The song was sampled by Eminem for the track "Greatest" on his 2018 album Kamikaze.

A remix of the song is also featured in the teaser trailer for Shazam!.

The song was featured during a scene in the movie Dumb Money.

The song was featured on Hollywood Rip Ride Rockit, a former steel roller coaster located at Universal Studios Florida in Orlando, Florida, United States.

The song was featured in the Super Bowl LVI halftime show trailer, but was not performed during its halftime show.

The song was further performed as Lamar would headline the Super Bowl LIX halftime show on February 9, 2025.

== Remixes ==
Many remixes have been made, including by singer Ne-Yo, released on May 3, 2017, and by electronic dance music producer Skrillex, released on September 22, 2017.

== Live performances ==
Lamar performed "Humble" live as a closer at the Coachella Valley Music and Arts Festival on April 23, 2017. Lamar has also performed "Humble" on The Damn Tour. Lamar performed the song during his 2017 MTV Video Music Awards. Lamar also performed the song as part of his special performance at halftime of the 2018 College Football Playoff National Championship Game and at the Super Bowl LIX halftime show.

== Awards ==
Year	Organization	Award	Result	Ref.
2017	MTV Video Music Awards	Video of the Year	Won	
2017	MTV Video Music Awards	Best Hip-Hop Video	Won	
2017	MTV Video Music Awards	Best Direction	Won	
2017	MTV Video Music Awards	Best Choreography	Nominated	
2017	MTV Video Music Awards	Best Visual Effects	Won	
2017	MTV Video Music Awards	Best Art Direction	Won	
2017	MTV Video Music Awards	Best Cinematography	Won	
2017	BET Hip Hop Awards	Best Hip Hop Video	Won	
2017	BET Hip Hop Awards	Impact Track	Nominated	
2017	BET Hip Hop Awards	Single of the Year	Nominated	
2017	UK Music Video Awards	Best Urban Video International	Nominated	
2017	UK Music Video Awards	Best Production Design in a Video	Nominated	
2017	UK Music Video Awards	Vevo Must See Award	Nominated	
2017	Soul Train Music Awards	Rhythm & Bars Award	Nominated	
2017	American Music Awards	Favorite Rap/Hip-Hop Song	Nominated	
2017	MTV Europe Music Awards	Best Video	Won	
2018	NAACP Image Awards	Outstanding Song	Won	
2018	Grammy Awards	Record of the Year	Nominated	
2018	Grammy Awards	Best Rap Performance	Won	
2018	Grammy Awards	Best Rap Song	Won	
2018	Grammy Awards	Best Music Video	Won	
2018	iHeartRadio Music Awards	Hip-Hop Song of the Year	Nominated	
2018	Nickelodeon Kids' Choice Awards	Favorite Song	Nominated	
2018	Billboard Music Awards	Top Hot 100 Song	Nominated	
2018	Billboard Music Awards	Top Streaming Song (Audio)	Won	
2018	Billboard Music Awards	Top Rap Song	Nominated	
2018	BET Awards	Video of the Year	Nominated	
2018	BET Awards	Coca-Cola Viewer's Choice Award	Nominated	

== Track listing ==
Digital download
No.	Title	Length
1.	"HUMBLE."	2:57

Digital download - SKRILLEX remix
No.	Title	Length
1.	"HUMBLE." (Skrillex Remix)	2:36

== Credits and personnel ==
Credits adapted from the official Damn digital booklet.

- Kendrick Lamar – songwriter
- Mike Will Made It – songwriter, producer
- Matt Schaeffer – guitar
- Derek Ali – mixing
- Tyler Page – mix assistant
- Cyrus Taghipour – mix assistant
- Derrick McCall – assistant

== Charts ==
=== Weekly charts ===
Weekly chart performance for "Humble"
Chart (2017–2025)	Peak position
Australia (ARIA)	2
Australia Urban (ARIA)	1
Austria (Ö3 Austria Top 40)	15
Belgium (Ultratop 50 Flanders)	15
Belgium (Ultratip Bubbling Under Wallonia)	5
Canada Hot 100 (Billboard)	2
Czech Republic Singles Digital (ČNS IFPI)	10
Denmark (Tracklisten)	18
Finland (Suomen virallinen lista)	14
France (SNEP)	11
Germany (GfK)	11
Global 200 (Billboard)	30
Hungary (Single Top 40)	37
Hungary (Stream Top 40)	8
Ireland (IRMA)	4
Italy (FIMI)	29
Latvia (DigiTop100)	19
Latvia (Latvijas Top 40)	8
Malaysia (RIM)	17
Netherlands (Dutch Top 40)	25
Netherlands (Single Top 100)	16
New Zealand (Recorded Music NZ)	1
Norway (VG-lista)	10
Philippines (Philippine Hot 100)	27
Portugal (AFP)	3
Scottish Singles Sales (Official Charts)	31
Slovakia Singles Digital (ČNS IFPI)	5
South Korea International (Gaon)	36
Spain (Promusicae)	61
Sweden (Sverigetopplistan)	10
Switzerland (Schweizer Hitparade)	17
UK Singles (Official Charts)	6
UK Hip Hop/R&B (Official Charts)	3
US Billboard Hot 100	1
US Hot R&B/Hip-Hop Songs (Billboard)	1
US Hot Rap Songs (Billboard)	1
US Pop Airplay (Billboard)	26
US Rhythmic Airplay (Billboard)	1
US Dance Airplay (Billboard)	30

=== Year-end charts ===
2017 year-end chart performance for "Humble"
Chart (2017)	Position
Australia (ARIA)	8
Australia Hip-Hop/R&B (ARIA)	1
Belgium (Ultratop Flanders)	55
Belgium R&B/Hip-Hop (Ultratop Flanders)	13
Brazil (Pro-Música Brasil)	175
Canada (Canadian Hot 100)	11
Denmark (Tracklisten)	68
France (SNEP)	89
Germany (Official German Charts)	99
Hungary (Stream Top 40)	55
Iceland (Tónlistinn)	26
Netherlands (Dutch Top 40)	143
Netherlands (Single Top 100)	95
New Zealand (Recorded Music NZ)	3
Portugal (AFP)	6
Sweden (Sverigetopplistan)	65
Switzerland (Schweizer Hitparade)	82
UK Singles (OCC)	47
US Billboard Hot 100	4
US Hot R&B/Hip-Hop Songs (Billboard)	2
US Hot Rap Songs (Billboard)	1
US Rhythmic (Billboard)	2

2018 year-end chart performance for "Humble"
Chart (2018)	Position
Australia (ARIA)	49
Australia Hip-Hop/R&B (ARIA)	18
Portugal (AFP)	85

2019 year-end chart performance for "Humble"
Chart (2019)	Position
Australia Hip-Hop/R&B (ARIA)	29

2020 year-end chart performance for "Humble"
Chart (2020)	Position
Australia Hip-Hop/R&B (ARIA)	48

2021 year-end chart performance for "Humble"
Chart (2021)	Position
Australia Hip-Hop/R&B (ARIA)	48

=== Decade-end charts ===
Decade-end chart performance for "Humble"
Chart (2010–2019)	Position
Australia (ARIA)	53
US Hot R&B/Hip-Hop Songs (Billboard)	43

== Certifications ==
Certifications and sales for "Humble"
Region	Certification	Certified units/sales
Australia (ARIA) Skrillex remix	14× Platinum	980,000^{‡}
Austria (IFPI Austria)	2× Platinum	60,000^{‡}
Belgium (BRMA)	Platinum	20,000^{‡}
Brazil (Pro-Música Brasil)	3× Platinum	180,000^{‡}
Canada (Music Canada)	Diamond	800,000^{‡}
Denmark (IFPI Danmark)	2× Platinum	180,000^{‡}
France (SNEP)	Diamond	333,333^{‡}
Germany (BVMI)	3× Gold	600,000^{‡}
Italy (FIMI)	2× Platinum	100,000^{‡}
New Zealand (RMNZ)	11× Platinum	330,000^{‡}
Poland (ZPAV)	3× Platinum	150,000^{‡}
Portugal (AFP)	5× Platinum	50,000^{‡}
Spain (Promusicae) Skrillex remix	Platinum	60,000^{‡}
Sweden (GLF)	Platinum	40,000^{‡}
United Kingdom (BPI)	3× Platinum	1,800,000^{‡}
United States (RIAA)	7× Platinum	7,000,000^{‡}
Streaming
Greece (IFPI Greece)	2× Platinum	4,000,000^{†}
^{‡} Sales+streaming figures based on certification alone.^{†} Streaming-only figures based on certification alone.

== Release history ==
Release dates for "Humble"
Region	Date	Format	Version	Label	Ref.
Various	March 30, 2017	Digital download	Original	Top Dawg; Aftermath; Interscope	
United States	April 4, 2017	Rhythmic contemporary radio	Original	Top Dawg; Aftermath; Interscope	
Italy	April 28, 2017	Contemporary hit radio	Original	Universal	
United States	May 16, 2017	Contemporary hit radio	Original	Top Dawg; Aftermath; Interscope	
Various	September 22, 2017	Digital download	Skrillex remix	Top Dawg; Aftermath; Interscope	

== See also ==
- List of Billboard Hot 100 number-one singles of 2017
- List of Billboard Rhythmic number-one songs of the 2010s
- List of highest-certified singles in Australia
- List of number-one singles from the 2010s (New Zealand)
- List of number-one urban singles of 2017 (Australia)
- List of number-one streaming tracks of 2017 (Australia)
- List of number-one R&B/hip-hop songs of 2017 (U.S.)
