= Used to This =

Single by Future featuring Drake

from the album Future
- Released: November 4, 2016
- Genre: Hip hop
- Length: 3:00
- Label: Freebandz; Epic
- Songwriters: Nayvadius Wilburn; Aubrey Graham; Xavier Dotson
- Producer: Zaytoven

Future singles chronology
"Rivals" (2016)	"Used to This" (2016)	"Everyday" (2017)

Drake singles chronology
"Two Birds, One Stone" (2016)	"Used to This" (2016)	"Both" (2017)

"Used to This" is a song by American rapper Future. It was released on November 4, 2016, by Freebandz and Epic Records, as the intended lead single from his then-unreleased mixtape Beast Mode 2 (2018), however, it was later included on the streaming version of Future (2017). The hip hop song, produced by Zaytoven, features a guest appearance from frequent collaborator Drake.

== Music video ==
The music video for "Used to This" was released via Future's Vevo account on November 4, 2016. In the video, they wear Mexican soccer jerseys and hold the Mexican flag to represent Mexico women's national football team.

== Charts ==
=== Weekly charts ===
Weekly chart performance for "Used to This"
Chart (2016–2017)	Peak position
Canada Hot 100 (Billboard)	17
France (SNEP)	139
New Zealand Heatseekers (RMNZ)	6
Switzerland (Schweizer Hitparade)	93
UK Singles (OCC)	67
US Billboard Hot 100	14
US Hot R&B/Hip-Hop Songs (Billboard)	5

=== Year-end charts ===
2017 year-end chart performance for "Used to This"
Chart (2017)	Position
US Hot R&B/Hip-Hop Songs (Billboard)	62

== Certifications ==
Sales and certifications for "Used to This"
Region	Certification	Certified units/sales
Canada (Music Canada)	Gold	40,000^{‡}
United Kingdom (BPI)	Silver	200,000^{‡}
United States (RIAA)	2× Platinum	2,000,000^{‡}
^{‡} Sales+streaming figures based on certification alone.
