= That's What I Like (Bruno Mars song) =

2017 single by Bruno Mars

- Remixes cover art

Single by Bruno Mars

from the album 24K Magic
- Released: January 30, 2017
- Recorded: 2016
- Studio: Glenwood Place (Burbank, California)
- Genre: Hip hop soul; pop; R&B
- Length: 3:26
- Label: Atlantic
- Songwriters: Bruno Mars; Philip Lawrence; Christopher Brody Brown; James Fauntleroy; Johnathan Yip; Ray Romulus; Jeremy Reeves; Ray McCullough II
- Producers: Shampoo Press & Curl; The Stereotypes (co.)

Bruno Mars singles chronology
"24K Magic" (2016)	"That's What I Like" (2017)	"Versace on the Floor" (2017)

Music video
- "That's What I Like" on YouTube

"That's What I Like" is a song by American singer-songwriter Bruno Mars from his third studio album, 24K Magic (2016). The song was written by Mars, Philip Lawrence, Christopher Brody Brown, James Fauntleroy, Johnathan Yip, Ray Romulus, Jeremy Reeves, and Ray McCullough II. The former three produced the song under the name of Shampoo Press & Curl with the latter four, as the Stereotypes, co-producing it. Atlantic Records released the song to Hot AC radio in the United States on January 30, 2017, as the second single from the album. The song is a hip hop soul, pop, and R&B track. The song's lyrics address extravagance, a luxurious lifestyle, and love.

"That's What I Like" received mixed reviews; some music critics considered it to be one of the best on 24K Magic, while others criticized its lyrical content. The song was a commercial success in the US, where it peaked at number one on the Billboard Hot 100; it reached number three in Canada and number four in New Zealand. "That's What I Like" has been certified diamond by the Recording Industry Association of America (RIAA), nine-times platinum by Recorded Music NZ (RMNZ) and diamond platinum by Music Canada (MC). It was also certified diamond by the Syndicat national de l'édition phonographique (SNEP). The song is the highest-charting single in the US from the album and was the world's fourth-best-selling digital single of 2017. It sold 9.7 million units, ranking among the best-selling singles worldwide.

The accompanying music video, which was directed by Jonathan Lia and Mars, depicts the latter reciting the song's lyrics and combines choreography with black-and-white animation. Mars performed the song on awards shows such as the 2017 Grammy Awards and the 2017 Brit Awards, and included it on his 24K Magic World Tour (2017–2018) and Bruno Mars Live (2020–2022). "That's What I Like" received several nominations and awards, winning Song of the Year at the 2017 Soul Train Music Awards, as well as Song of the Year, Best R&B Song, and Best R&B Performance at the 2018 Grammy Awards. The song has been covered by various singers.

== Background and development ==
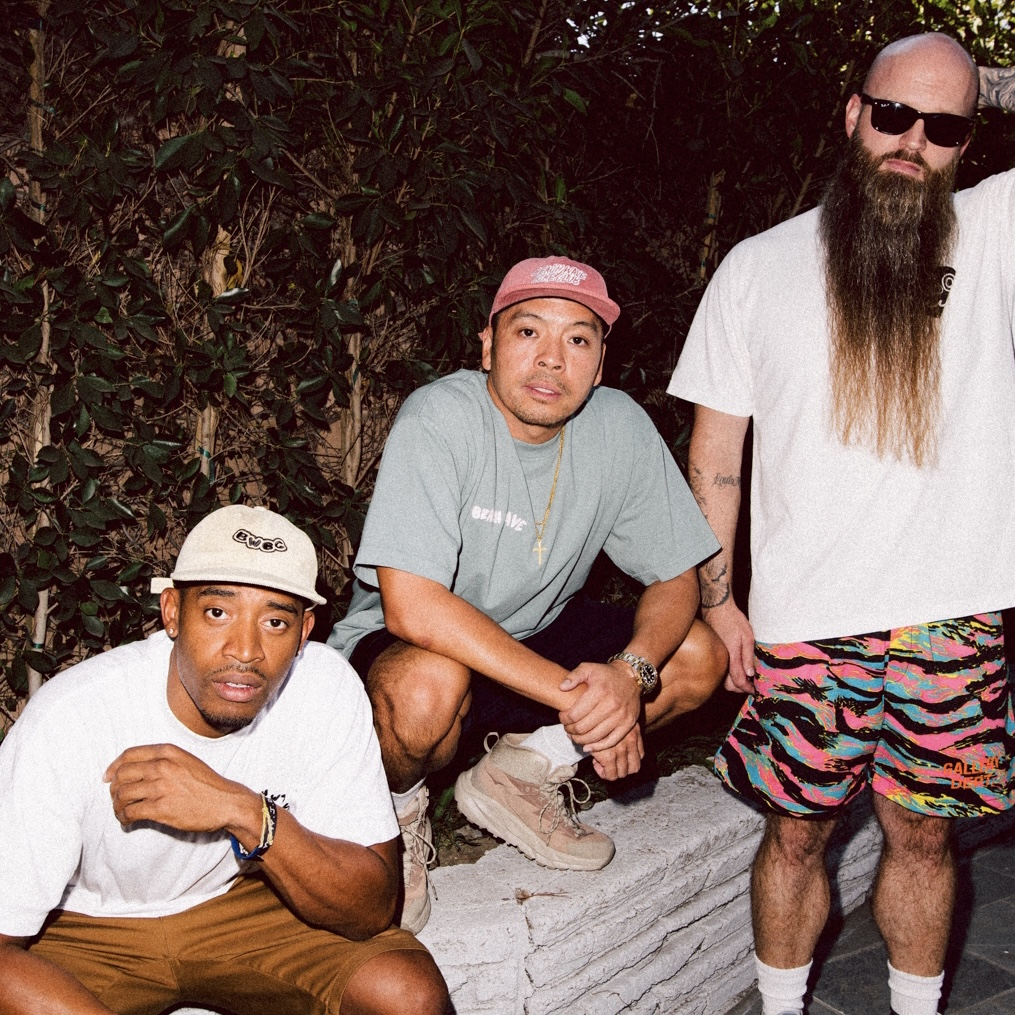
The Stereotypes (pictured) co-produced and co-wrote "That's What I Like".

In September 2014, Bruno Mars tweeted, "Now it's time to start writing chapter 3", hinting he was working on new music. Following the release of the successful Mark Ronson's single, "Uptown Funk" (2014) featuring Mars, the latter headed to the studio to record more songs. Mars affirmed he had no plans to release a new album "until it's done". It was due in March 2016, but his appearance at the Super Bowl halftime show postponed it for several months. At the time, seven songs were already recorded.

The Stereotypes had known Mars and worked with him since 2007, but after he signed a deal with Atlantic Records they did not collaborate very often. In 2015, Jonathan Yip talked with Mars about working together. Mars was already recording 24K Magic and asked for "some beats", which Yip sent. He later asked for more beats and the Stereotypes sent them, but they never heard from him; "nothing came of it". In June 2016, Yip contacted Mars, who asked Yip if they would like to help him finish a song for his album; he needed another song with a certain tempo and key. Yip sent Mars an idea that caught his attention; he asked the Stereotypes to go to the studio. After they helped Mars finish "24K Magic", Mars challenged the team to help him with two more songs.

At this point, Mars had already shown the Stereotypes two songs, including a fully written and produced demo of "That's What I Like" that sounded like a ballad, according to Ray Romulus. However, Mars told the Stereotypes that he wanted the song to make him move in a certain way and that it was missing a certain "bounce". Mars wanted them to focus on the "groove, shifting and fine-tuning" until they found the "precise ingredient of danceable joy" that he wanted. The team started to change the rhythms and the drums of the song, and Mars danced along to it and stopped when he could not move to a chord or drum. Once the programming of the drums was finished, the song had a different feeling; despite its slow tempo it had a "danceable double-time". This is due to the trap beats, which modernized the track and gave it "bounce". Then, the Stereotypes tore everything else apart, giving the track new chords and a new pre-hook, B section, and bridge.

In November 2017, Mars was a guest on the Charlie Rose Show. He said the album was intended to make people feel fabulous: "I'm talking about eating shrimp scampi and lobster tails and drinking strawberry champagne". Romulus said the lyrical concept came from Mars, adding, "All that about the Cadillacs and champagne ... that's how Bruno is. He's giving you a day in the life". During a phone interview with CBS Mars said that he second guessed the song, having to listen to it "for over a year to make sure it's all right." It was the first song that Mars asked James Fauntleroy to help him write.

== Production and release ==
"That's What I Like" was written by Mars, Philip Lawrence, Christopher Brody Brown, Fauntleroy, Yip, Romulus, Jeremy Reeves, and Ray McCullough II. It was produced by Mars, Lawrence and Brown under the alias Shampoo Press & Curl; and co-produced by Yip, McCullough, Romulus, and Reeves as the Stereotypes. Eric "E-Panda" Hernandez played the live drums while Mars, Fauntleroy, and Lawrence performed background vocals. At Glenwood Place Studios in Burbank, California, Charles Moniz recorded and engineered the track with assistance from Jacob Dennis. It was mixed at MixStar Studios in Virginia Beach by Serban Ghenea, with John Hanes serving as mixing engineer. The track was mastered by Tom Coyne at Sterling Sound, NYC.

"Versace on the Floor" was scheduled to be the second single released from Mars's third studio album 24K Magic (2016). However, in early January 2017, AllAccess reported that "That's What I Like" was being sent to Top 40 radio stations as the second single instead. Atlantic Records released the track on January 30, 2017, to adult contemporary, hot adult contemporary and modern adult contemporary radio stations in the United States and to American contemporary hit radio and rhythmic contemporary stations on the next day. BBC Radio 1 began adding the song onto their playlists on February 24, 2017. In Italy, the song was sent for radio airplay on March 3, 2017, through Warner. On April 21, 2017, a package with four remixes of the song was released for digital download in various countries.

== Composition ==
"That's What I Like"
An 18-second sample of "That's What I Like", where Mars sings about jewelry and a luxurious lifestyle.

"That's What I Like" is a hip hop soul, pop, R&B, and funk song. It was composed in the key of B♭ minor at a tempo of 67 beats per minute. The song features Mars in the center of the track, supported by enthusiastic backing vocals, Boyz II Men-style finger-snaps, a "silky pre-chorus", and "punctuating ad libs". Bill Lamb of ThoughtCo described the single as an "R&B groove, giving a nod to the new jack swing music of the late 1980s and early 1990s".

Billboard's Andrew Unterberger said the song is reminiscent of the R&B from the early 1990s, infused with New Jack Swing and a little hip-hop, comparing it to the "harmonies and Uptown production of early Jodeci". Christopher Weingarten of Rolling Stone wrote that the track "brings the silky vibes" of R. Kelly's 12 Play (1993) "into the boom of modern trap". Chris Molanphy from Slate defined "That's What I Like" as a mix of the "80s-into-90s styles like New Edition pop-and-B and New Jack Swing" infused with "the skittering, thumping 808 drums of a modern trap" song. He compared Mars's vocals to those of Bobby Brown, especially in his "high-register vocal". Katherine St. Asaph of Pitchfork compared its sound to that of The 20/20 Experience (2013) by Justin Timberlake. Vulture's Craig Jenkins noted a resemblance between the composition of "That's What I Like" and The Neptunes' production of "Kitty Kat" (2006) by Beyoncé. The lyrics of the song have been described as "playful" and "opulent"; they were written from the point of view of someone "who loves himself" and luxury ("strawberry champagne and ice bucket") as much as his lover, with her being promised everything she wants, being allowed to "dictate the pace of the night". Mars references "Julio" from "Uptown Funk". On February 26, 2019, West Java's Indonesian Broadcasting Commission placed a daytime ban on the radio broadcast of several songs, including "That's What I Like", due to their adult, offensive and obscene lyrics.

== Critical reception ==
"That's What I Like" received mostly positive reviews from music critics. Andrew Unterberger, writing for Billboard, and Rob Arcand of Spin found the single to be one of the best on 24K Magic. Vulture's Jenkins said the track is one of the best on the album and sonically one of the "most modern" songs due to "a killer vocal and tasteful trap drums". Peter Helman of Stereogum said the recording is one of the "catchiest" tracks on 24K Magic. Caroline Sullivan from The Guardian praised the song for paying homage to R Kelly, calling it a "resurrection". Karen Gwee from Consequence of Sound commended Mars's vocals and said the singer takes his vocals to the limit. Gwee dubbed the track "giddy". The Observer's Kitty Empire praised the lyrics, saying Mars is able to give "conspicuous consumption with more charm than boorishness". In a mixed review Nick Levine, writing for NME, said he did not enjoy the track's lyrics, despite finding them playful.

Jonathan Wroble of Slant Magazine criticized the lyrics, saying they appear to be "written with a dollar store's rhyming dictionary". He chose the rhymes between "beach house in Miami" and "Julio, serve that scampi" as an example. The Independent's Andy Gill and Patrick Ryan from USA Today both found the lyrics on "That's What I Like" to exhibit a list of "unimaginative" and "obnoxious" hedonism.

"That's What I Like" was listed as the second best song of 2017 according to Associated Press's Mesfin Fekadu. She said, "Bruno Mars is perfect. That is all." It was the 34th among Billboard's 100 Best Songs of 2017: Critics' Picks list; Ross Scarano wrote that Mars "is a pop star of total hospitality" showing several clichés of a luxurious life, such as "sex in front of the fireplace and champagne with strawberries", "waking up inside clean sheets without any clothes on", and "the private chef, Julio, preparing shrimp scampi for dinner". In late 2017, Bill Lamb of ThoughtCo considered the single the fourth-best song by Mars. Minou Clark from HuffPost called the single "the ultimate cuffing season anthem" due to its "sexy smooth melody". In 2026, Walaa Elsiddig writing for Billboard felt the song holds "a polished, timeless feel."

=== Accolades ===
In 2017, "That's What I Like" was nominated for Choice Song: Male Artist, Choice Music: Summer Song and Choice Music: R&B/Hip-Hop Song at the Teen Choice Awards. That same year, the song was also nominated for Song of the Year at the Telehit Awards. The single received the awards for Favorite Soul/R&B Song at the 2017 American Music Awards and for Song of the Year at the Soul Train Music Awards. In 2018, "That's What I Like" won Song of the Year, Best R&B Performance and Best R&B Song at the 2018 Grammy Awards. The track received a nomination for Favorite Song at the Nickelodeon Kids' Choice Awards and won R&B Song of the Year, whilst being nominated for Song of the Year at the 2018 iHeartRadio Music Awards. It also received a Titanium Award from iHeartRadio for reaching a threshold of 1 billion total audience spins. In the same year, Cabuizee's version of the song was nominated for Best Trap Remix at the Remix Awards.

It was nominated for Top Hot 100 Song, Top Streaming Song (Video), Top Radio Song and Top R&B Song at the Billboard Music Awards, winning in the latter category. The song was one of the Top 10 Gold International Gold Songs at the RTHK International Pop Poll Awards. That same year, the track received the first issued accolade for Outstanding Song, Traditional category at the 2018 NAACP Image Awards. "That's What I Like" received two awards from ASCAP, one from the Pop Music Awards as one of the Most Performed Songs, and another from the Rhythm & Soul Music Awards as Top R&B/Hip-Hop Song. In the following year, at the same award ceremonies, it won, again, Most Performed Songs and it was one of the winners of Winning R&B/Hip-Hop Song.

== Commercial performance ==
=== North America ===
Upon the album's release, "That's What I Like" debuted at number 79 on the Billboard Hot 100 chart for the issue week of December 10, 2016. In February 2017, Mars's performance at the 2017 Grammy Awards helped the song to enter the top 10 of the Hot 100, where it remained for two months. The single rose to number two on the chart, spending four weeks there behind Ed Sheeran's "Shape of You" (2017). After the release of several remixes, featuring artists such as Gucci Mane and PartyNextDoor, "That's What I Like" climbed to number one in its fifteenth week on the chart, replacing Kendrick Lamar's "Humble" (2017). Both songs spent one week on the top of the chart and the former became Mars's seventh number one single on the Hot 100. The track spent a total of ten weeks at number two on the Billboard Hot 100. It spent 24 weeks in the top five of the Billboard Hot 100, becoming one of five singles to spend at least 24 weeks in the top five and 28 weeks in the top ten. As of 2018, Mars, Sheeran, and Jewel are the only artists with two songs to spend at least half a year in the top 10 of the Hot 100. The song spent a total of 52 weeks on the chart and ranked at number three on the Year-End Billboard Hot 100.

On the Radio Songs chart, "That's What I Like" peaked at number one and spent nine weeks there, becoming Mars's longest run at the top as a solo artist. In 2026, Mars broke this record with his single "I Just Might". On the Mainstream Top 40 chart, the single peaked at number one, tying Mars with Justin Timberlake for the highest total among solo males of number one songs on the chart, with eight each one. For the week of July 22, 2017, the song returned to the top of the Hot R&B Songs chart, spending 20 weeks at number one. At the time, it tied with The Weeknd's "Starboy" (2016) and Drake's "One Dance" (2016), featuring WizKid and Kyla, for the most weeks spent at number one. In August 2020, the achievement was broken by The Weeknd's "Blinding Lights" (2019). "That's What I Like" peaked at number one on the US Hot R&B/Hip-Hop Songs Chart and topped the Year-End Chart in the format. The track reached the top spot on the Rhythmic chart. The single was certified diamond by the Recording Industry Association of America (RIAA). It became the fourth best-selling song of 2017 in the US, with 1,673,000 downloads and 835,856,000 streams. In August 2025, Billboard revealed the "Top Hot R&B/Hip-Hop Songs of the 21st Century", "That's What I Like" was number six one the chart.

On the Canadian Hot 100, the song peaked at number three on April 17, 2017, spending 38 weeks on the chart, and it was certified diamond Music Canada (MC). The song ended 2017 at number seven on the Year-End Charts in Canada.

=== International ===
"That's What I Like" peaked at number 12 on the UK singles chart and was certified triple platinum by the British Phonographic Industry (BPI), denoting sales and streams equivalent to 1,800,000 units. On the Belgian charts, the single debuted at number 34 on February 25, 2017, on the Ultratop 50 in Flanders, peaking at number three for two consecutive weeks in April. On the Ultratop 50 in Wallonia, the song debuted at number 34 on March 25, 2017, and went on to peak at number eight in May. It was certified platinum by the Belgian Entertainment Association (BEA). The track peaked at number seven on the Portuguese Single Charts. It earned a platinum plaque from the Associação Fonográfica Portuguesa (AFP). Despite only peaking at number 42 in France, "That's What I Like" was certified diamond by the Syndicat National de l'Édition Phonographique (SNEP). "That's What I Like" entered the Official New Zealand Music Chart at number 26 on February 20, 2017. In its sixth week, the track peaked at number four, where it remained for two weeks. The song ranked at the fifth spot on the 2017 Year-End List and received a nine-time platinum certification from the Recording Industry Association of New Zealand (RMNZ). In Australia, the single debuted at number 47 on the ARIA Singles Chart for the week of March 5, 2017. In its sixth week on the chart, the song peaked at number five, becoming Mars's twelfth top-ten single in Australia. It was certified four-times platinum by the Australian Recording Industry Association (ARIA) for exceeding 70,000 units. The song reached the top 20 in several other countries, including Denmark, Ireland, and Scotland. The song was the fourth-best-selling digital single of 2017, with 9.7 million units.

== Music video ==
=== Background and concept ===
On March 1, 2017, Mars announced on his Twitter account that he had been filming the accompanying music video for "That's What I Like"; he said, "Just finished shootin it! I'm gonna edit it, take a bubble bath & then we party. Gimme 2 hours! Let the count down begin #TWIL". The visual was directed by Mars and Jonathan Lia. The choreography was done by the singer and Phil Tayag prior to the shooting, allowing Lia and Mars to produce animations before filming the video. Some animations were added in post-production by GenPop. The music video was filmed against a grey background in Los Angeles using a stationary camera throughout the entire shot. Several hand-drawn animations "relating to the lyrics" appeared and vanished off-frame; to create this effect, Lia filmed Mars while the song was played at half-speed. Lia then doubled the speed of the footage, making the "synced playback" have a "surreal feel to it", with a single, eight-minute take. Mars and Lia had a different concept for the music video, but the result was not what they expected when the two carried out a test shoot, and they decided to use a single light. When Mars started to dance, him and Lia they knew "that was the video". The video was released on March 1, 2017, via YouTube.

=== Synopsis ===
The visual begins with Mars wearing a black, white, and gold-striped silk shirt, black track pants, white sneakers and sunglasses. During the video, Mars dances alone against a white background with several animations, which move with him during his choreography, enacting the lyrics and music. The black-and-white animations include a mirror, Manhattan condominium, sipping strawberry champagne glasses, driving a Cadillac and its wheels, traveling to Paris, and dancing partners that appear as Mars dances across the screen. The cartoon sketches, related to the lyrics, were drawn to show the flexibility of the singer's dance moves. According to Rania Aniftos, Mars exudes charm throughout the music video.

=== Reception ===
Critics including Althea Legaspi from Rolling Stone and Minou Clark of HuffPost complimented Mars's dancing skills and choreography. Mike Wass, writing for Idolator, and Vulture's Karen Brill compared the video to Drake's "Hotline Bling" (2015) due to its simplicity and "unadulterated feeling-yourself-ness". Wass and the staff of Rap-Up called Mars's footwork "fancy", while Brill said the visual is "wondrous" but that it should include "the ubiquitous music video cube". Vibe's J'na Jefferson shared a similar perspective, saying "the magic of this video is in the simplicity" because of Mars's performance skills, visual effects, and editing. Alex Young of Consequence of Sound praised the combination of the choreographed dance and the animation. Billboard's Rania Aniftos praised the music video, saying it will make viewers smile and hit "the replay button". In 2017, it won Best Male Video at the MTV Video Music Awards Japan and was nominated for Best International Video at the LOS40 Music Awards 2017, a category decided by a Jury. The video received the award for Video of the Year at the 2017 American Music Awards. In 2018, it won the award for Outstanding Music Video at the NAACP Image Awards and earned a nomination for Best Music Video at the iHeartRadio Music Awards. The video effects were available on Facebook for users to try; it was the first time the platform made a based camera effect around music. As of October 2025, the music video has reached over 2.4 billion views.

== Live performances and use in other media ==
Mars's first live performance of "That's What I Like" occurred at the 59th Annual Grammy Awards on February 12, 2017. Mars danced in synchronization with his backup singers, and towards the end of the song he made a "doo-wop harmonizing" breakdown while interacting with women in the crowd and using his falsetto vocals. The performance was well received by critics. Joe Lynch of Billboard rated Mars's performance 11 out of 20, saying, "Bruno Mars is one of pop's finest showmen" who "can make an unextraordinary song such as 'That's What I Like' sound like a bona fide hit ... he sang the hell out of it". Billy Nilles of E! News wrote that Mars showed his "smooth dance moves and silky vocals", and that "every lady in the crowd looked as they were putty in Bruno's hand". Rolling Stone's Elias Leight described the singer as being on "seduction mode", using his vocals to demonstrate it. Mars' voice reminded Leigh of the "firepower" of New Edition's Johnny Gill.

Mars performed the song live at the 2017 Brit Awards on February 21; he was "dressed in a vintage-inspired 1990s color-block collared top with navy slacks" and along with his band, performed a routine choreography. Halfway through the track, Mars serenaded the audience. At the 2017 iHeartRadio Music Awards, he performed the song as part of a medley with "Treasure", a track on Mars's second studio album Unorthodox Jukebox (2012). Andrew Unterberger, writing for Billboard, found the performance to be the best of the night because Mars made the medley work "seamlessly". An acoustic version of the single was performed on the Charlie Rose Show; it featured Mars and some of his bandmates sitting at a table and using it as a soft drum set. Mars performed the single at the Apollo Theater alongside the majority of the 24K Magic album for his CBS prime time special titled Bruno Mars: 24K Magic Live at the Apollo, which aired on November 29, 2017. "That's What I Like" was also sung during the Mars's third tour, 24K Magic World Tour (2017–18) and it was part of the set list of An Evening with Silk Sonic at Park MGM (2022), a concert residency performed by Mars with Anderson .Paak, as Silk Sonic. Mars also performed it as a medley with "Wake Up in the Sky" and "Please Me" on his shows of Bruno Mars Live (2020–2022). Starting on October 4, 2024, the medley one included "That's What I Like" and "Please Me".

Kurt Hugo Schneider and Mario Jose covered "That's What I Like", releasing their version for download on July 13, 2017. Macy Kate recorded a cover of the single, which is now only available on YouTube.

== Track listings ==
Digital download – Alan Walker Remix
No.	Title	Length
1.	"That's What I Like" (Alan Walker Remix)	3:14

Digital download – BLVK JVCK Remix
No.	Title	Length
1.	"That's What I Like" (BLVK JVCK Remix)	3:45

Digital download – Gucci Mane Remix
No.	Title	Length
1.	"That's What I Like" (Remix) (featuring Gucci Mane)	3:54

Digital download – PartyNextDoor Remix
No.	Title	Length
1.	"That's What I Like" (PartyNextDoor Remix)	3:26

== Personnel ==
Credits adapted from the liner notes of 24K Magic.

- Bruno Mars – lead vocals, songwriting, background vocals
- Philip Lawrence – songwriting, background vocals
- Christopher Brody Brown – songwriting
- James Fauntleroy – songwriting, background vocals
- Johnathan Yip – songwriting
- Ray Romulus – songwriting
- Jeremy Reeves – songwriting
- Ray McCullough II – songwriting
- Eric "E-Panda" Hernandez – live drums
- Shampoo Press & Curl – production
- The Stereotypes – co–production
- Charles Moniz – recording, engineering
- Jacob Dennis – engineering assistance
- Serban Ghenea – mixing
- John Hanes – mix engineering
- Tom Coyne – mastering

== Charts ==
=== Weekly charts ===
List of chart positions
Chart (2017)	Peak position
Argentina (Monitor Latino)	11
Australia (ARIA)	5
Austria (Ö3 Austria Top 40)	54
Belgium (Ultratop 50 Flanders)	3
Belgium (Ultratop 50 Wallonia)	8
Brazil (Brasil Hot 100 Airplay)	2
Canada Hot 100 (Billboard)	3
Canada AC (Billboard)	7
Canada CHR/Top 40 (Billboard)	2
Canada Hot AC (Billboard)	2
Colombia (National-Report)	40
Czech Republic Airplay (ČNS IFPI)	54
Czech Republic Singles Digital (ČNS IFPI)	16
Denmark (Tracklisten)	18
France (SNEP)	42
Germany (GfK)	51
Guatemala (Monitor Latino)	14
Hungary (Single Top 40)	33
Hungary (Stream Top 40)	20
Ireland (IRMA)	20
Israel International Airplay (Media Forest)	2
Italy (FIMI)	34
Japan Hot 100 (Billboard)	43
Malaysia (RIM)	3
Mexico (Billboard Mexican Airplay)	37
Netherlands (Dutch Top 40)	19
Netherlands (Single Top 100)	24
New Zealand (Recorded Music NZ)	4
Norway (VG-lista)	40
Panama (Monitor Latino)	14
Paraguay (Monitor Latino)	3
Philippines (Philippine Hot 100)	2
Poland Airplay (ZPAV)	39
Portugal (AFP)	7
South Korea International (Gaon)	7
Scottish Singles Sales (Official Charts)	18
Slovakia Singles Digital (ČNS IFPI)	29
Spain (Promusicae)	27
Sweden (Sverigetopplistan)	51
Switzerland (Schweizer Hitparade)	39
UK Singles (Official Charts)	12
US Billboard Hot 100	1
US Adult Contemporary (Billboard)	12
US Adult Pop Airplay (Billboard)	2
US Dance Club Songs (Billboard)	25
US Dance Airplay (Billboard)	3
US Hot R&B/Hip-Hop Songs (Billboard)	1
US Latin Airplay (Billboard)	32
US Pop Airplay (Billboard)	1
US Rhythmic Airplay (Billboard)	1
Venezuela (National-Report)	33
Venezuela (Record Report)	65

List of chart positions
Chart (2023–2026)	Peak position
Brazil Hot 100 (Billboard)	50
Global 200 (Billboard)	37
Malaysia (Billboard)	22
Malaysia International (RIM)	20
Philippines (Philippines Hot 100)	14
Singapore (RIAS)	8
South Korea (Circle)	117
Taiwan (Billboard)	13

=== Year-end charts ===
List of chart positions
Chart (2017)	Position
Argentina (Monitor Latino)	24
Australia (ARIA)	25
Belgium (Ultratop Flanders)	24
Belgium (Ultratop Wallonia)	50
Brazil (Pro-Música Brasil)	64
Canada (Canadian Hot 100)	7
Denmark (Tracklisten)	67
France (SNEP)	128
Hungary (Stream Top 40)	65
Iceland (Tónlistinn)	47
Israel International Airplay (Media Forest)	20
Netherlands (Single Top 100)	76
New Zealand (Recorded Music NZ)	5
Spain (PROMUSICAE)	95
UK Singles (OCC)	36
US Billboard Hot 100	3
US Adult Contemporary (Billboard)	25
US Adult Top 40 (Billboard)	10
US Dance/Mix Show Airplay (Billboard)	9
US Hot R&B/Hip-Hop Songs (Billboard)	1
US Mainstream Top 40 (Billboard)	2
US Rhythmic (Billboard)	4
Worldwide (IFPI)	4

List of chart positions
Chart (2025)	Position
Global 200 (Billboard)	164

=== Decade-end charts ===
Decade-end chart performance
Chart (2010–2019)	Position
US Billboard Hot 100	30
US Hot R&B/Hip-Hop Songs (Billboard)	2

=== All-time charts ===
List of chart position
Charts	Position
US Billboard Hot 100 (1958–2018)	113

== Certifications ==
List of certifications
Region	Certification	Certified units/sales
Australia (ARIA)	4× Platinum	280,000^{‡}
Belgium (BRMA)	Platinum	20,000^{‡}
Canada (Music Canada)	Diamond	800,000^{‡}
Denmark (IFPI Danmark)	2× Platinum	180,000^{‡}
France (SNEP)	Diamond	333,333^{‡}
Germany (BVMI)	Gold	200,000^{‡}
Italy (FIMI)	Platinum	50,000^{‡}
New Zealand (RMNZ)	9× Platinum	270,000^{‡}
Poland (ZPAV)	2× Platinum	100,000^{‡}
Portugal (AFP)	4× Platinum	40,000^{‡}
Spain (Promusicae)	2× Platinum	120,000^{‡}
Sweden (GLF)	Gold	20,000^{‡}
United Kingdom (BPI)	3× Platinum	1,800,000^{‡}
United States (RIAA)	Diamond	10,000,000^{‡}
Streaming
Japan (RIAJ)	Platinum	100,000,000^{†}
^{‡} Sales+streaming figures based on certification alone.^{†} Streaming-only figures based on certification alone.

== Release history ==
List of release history, showing region(s), date(s), format(s), version(s) and label(s)
Region	Date	Format	Versions	Label	Ref.
United States	January 30, 2017	Adult contemporary radio	Original	Atlantic	
United States	January 30, 2017	Hot adult contemporary radio	Original	Atlantic	
United States	January 30, 2017	Modern adult contemporary radio	Original	Atlantic	
United States	January 31, 2017	Contemporary hit radio	Original	Atlantic	
United States	January 31, 2017	Rhythmic contemporary	Original	Atlantic	
Italy	March 3, 2017	Radio airplay	Original	Warner Music Group	
Various	April 21, 2017	Digital download	Remix package	Atlantic	

== See also ==
- List of Billboard Hot 100 number ones of 2017
- List of Billboard Mainstream Top 40 number-one songs of 2017
- List of Billboard Rhythmic number-one songs of the 2010s
- List of number-one R&B/hip-hop songs of 2017 (U.S.)
