= Both (song) =

Single by Gucci Mane featuring Drake

from the album The Return of East Atlanta Santa
- Released: January 31, 2017
- Recorded: 2016
- Genre: Trap
- Length: 3:10
- Label: GUWOP; 1017; Atlantic
- Songwriters: Radric Davis; Aubrey Graham; Leland Wayne; Joshua Luellen
- Producers: Metro Boomin; Southside

Gucci Mane singles chronology
"Good Drank" (2017)	"Both" (2017)	"Make Love" (2017)

Drake singles chronology
"Used to This" (2016)	"Both" (2017)	"No Frauds" (2017)

"Both" is a song by American rapper Gucci Mane featuring Canadian rapper Drake, released as the third single from the former's tenth studio album The Return of East Atlanta Santa. The song was written by the artists alongside producers Metro Boomin and Southside. The song marks their second collaboration following their 2016 single "Back on Road".

== Release ==
On December 15, 2016, Gucci Mane teased the third single for the album, called "Both". The song features guest vocals from Drake, with production by Metro Boomin and Southside. It was then sent to urban radio January 31, 2017, as the third official single.

== Remix ==
On April 13, 2017, an official remix featuring an additional verse from Lil Wayne was released.

== Chart performance ==
"Both" debuted at number 41 on the Billboard Hot 100 and would go on to chart for 22 weeks. It became Gucci Mane's longest-charting single as lead artist on the charts, behind "Black Beatles", which is his biggest hit overall. It also peaked at number 43 on the Canadian Hot 100 and number 16 on the Hot R&B/Hip-Hop Songs chart. Drake's contribution earned him his 132nd chart entry, tying Lil Wayne's record for the most chart entries. The song also peaked at number one on the Billboard urban airplay chart, becoming Gucci Mane's first number one single and Drake's 21st number one on that chart.

== Charts ==
=== Weekly charts ===
Chart (2016–2017)	Peak position
Canada Hot 100 (Billboard)	43
US Billboard Hot 100	41
US Hot R&B/Hip-Hop Songs (Billboard)	16
US Rhythmic Airplay (Billboard)	10

=== Year-end charts ===
Chart (2017)	Position
US Billboard Hot 100	83
US Hot R&B/Hip-Hop Songs (Billboard)	36
US Rhythmic (Billboard)	43
US Streaming Songs (Billboard)	60

== Certifications ==
Region	Certification	Certified units/sales
United Kingdom (BPI)	Silver	200,000^{‡}
United States (RIAA)	4× Platinum	4,000,000^{‡}
^{‡} Sales+streaming figures based on certification alone.
