= Blood (Kendrick Lamar song) =

Promotional single by Kendrick Lamar

from the album Damn
- Released: April 14, 2017
- Recorded: 2017
- Genre: Spoken word
- Length: 1:58
- Label: Top Dawg; Aftermath; Interscope
- Songwriters: Kendrick Duckworth; Daniel Tannenbaum; Anthony Tiffith
- Producers: Bēkon; Tiffith

"Blood" (stylized as "BLOOD.") is a song by American rapper Kendrick Lamar, from his fourth studio album Damn, released on April 14, 2017. As the opening track on the album (fourteenth and final on the Collector's Edition of Damn), the song was written by Lamar, Daniel Tannenbaum, and Anthony Tiffith, and produced by Bēkon and Tiffith.

== Composition ==
The track consists of Lamar telling a story in which he is shot by a blind woman he tries to help. According to Genius, the woman represents the consequences of the Damnation from the Book of Deuteronomy. The intro is followed by audio of Fox News' reporters criticizing Lamar.

Lamar himself has stated the intro as a struggle between wickedness and weakness, essentially the battle between good and evil.

== Samples ==
The track contains an excerpt from Fox News' The Five members Eric Bolling, Kimberly Guilfoyle, and Geraldo Rivera criticizing Lamar's performance of "Alright" at the 2015 BET Awards. Lamar would later call out Rivera and Fox News on the album's third track, "Yah".

== Critical reception ==
According to rap-up.com, the song is enough for one to say "DAMN." (a play on the title of the album), and begs the listener to "further analyze the flawed system [the song] dissects."

== Credits and personnel ==
Credits adapted from the official Damn digital booklet.

- Kendrick Lamar – songwriter
- Daniel Tannenbaum – songwriter
- Anthony Tiffith – songwriter, producer
- Bēkon – producer, additional vocals
- Derek Ali – mixing
- Tyler Page – mix assistant
- Cyrus Taghipour – mix assistant

== Charts ==
Chart (2017)	Peak position
Canada Hot 100 (Billboard)	41
Czech Republic Singles Digital (ČNS IFPI)	98
France (SNEP)	119
Ireland (IRMA)	41
Netherlands (Single Top 100)	69
New Zealand Heatseekers (Recorded Music NZ)	1
Portugal (AFP)	38
Slovakia Singles Digital (ČNS IFPI)	59
Sweden (Sverigetopplistan)	95
UK Singles (Official Charts)	56
US Billboard Hot 100	54
US Hot R&B/Hip-Hop Songs (Billboard)	31

== Certifications ==
Region	Certification	Certified units/sales
Australia (ARIA)	Gold	35,000^{‡}
Canada (Music Canada)	Gold	40,000^{‡}
United States (RIAA)	Gold	500,000^{‡}
^{‡} Sales+streaming figures based on certification alone.
