= Damn (album) =

Studio album by Kendrick Lamar
- Released: April 14, 2017
- Studios: Henson (Hollywood); Jungle City (New York City); No Excuses (Santa Monica); Windmark (Santa Monica)
- Genre: Conscious hip-hop
- Length: 54:54
- Labels: TDE; Aftermath; Interscope
- Producers: 9th Wonder; the Alchemist; BadBadNotGood; Bekon; Cardo; DJ Dahi; Greg Kurstin; James Blake; Mike Will Made It; Ricci Riera; Sounwave; Steve Lacy; Terrace Martin; Teddy Walton; Top Dawg

Kendrick Lamar chronology
Untitled Unmastered (2016)	Damn (2017)	Black Panther: The Album (2018)

Singles from Damn
- 1. "Humble" Released: March 30, 2017; 2. "Loyalty" Released: June 20, 2017; 3. "Love" Released: October 2, 2017

Damn (stylized as DAMN.) is the fourth studio album by the American rapper Kendrick Lamar, released on April 14, 2017, by Top Dawg Entertainment, Aftermath Entertainment, and Interscope Records. Lamar assembled numerous artists and producers to create the album, including executive producer and Top Dawg Entertainment label head Anthony "Top Dawg" Tiffith, Sounwave, DJ Dahi, Mike Will Made It, and Ricci Riera, as well as further production contributions from James Blake, Steve Lacy, BadBadNotGood, Greg Kurstin, the Alchemist, and 9th Wonder, among others. It features guest appearances from Rihanna, Zacari, and U2.

The album has been categorized as conscious hip-hop, but also incorporates elements of trap, contemporary R&B, and pop. Prior to the album's release, Lamar released a promotional single, "The Heart Part 4". In the months that followed, Lamar released three singles from the album; "Humble" was released in March 2017, "Loyalty" in June 2017, and "Love" in October 2017, the first of which became Lamar's first number-one single on the US Billboard Hot 100 as a lead artist.

Damn received widespread acclaim from critics, with many naming the album one of the best albums of 2017 and the decade. The album topped the US Billboard 200 with 603,000 album-equivalent units earned in its first week and topped the chart of Canada while reaching number two in Australia, Belgium, Denmark, Ireland, the Netherlands, Norway, Sweden, and the United Kingdom. It has since been certified triple platinum by the Recording Industry Association of America (RIAA) in May 2018 and was the Billboard Year-End number one album of 2017. The album earned Lamar the 2018 Pulitzer Prize for Music, the first time an artist outside of the classical and jazz genres received the honor. It also earned the Best Rap Album at the 2018 Grammy Awards. In 2020, Damn was ranked 175th on Rolling Stone's updated list of "The 500 Greatest Albums of All Time".

== Recording and production ==
The beat for "Humble" was developed by Mike Will with the intention of recording with Gucci Mane, but later showed it to Kendrick Lamar. After recording, it was initially agreed upon that it would be released on Mike Will's debut album Ransom 2, but others convinced Lamar to keep it for his own next album.

"DNA" was the second song from the album to be recorded by Lamar and Mike Will, after "Humble". After the first verse of "DNA" was recorded with the beat that Mike Will had already prepared, Lamar started rapping the second verse a cappella, requesting that Mike Will build the beat around the rhymes. Lamar proposed that it sound like "chaos", and Mike Will put together the second half of the song with the intention to make it "sound like he's battling the beat".

Lamar has said in interviews that the ability to play the album in reverse tracklist order was "premeditated ... in the studio": "It plays as a full story and even a better rhythm. It's one of my favorite rhythms and tempos within the album".

=== Musical style ===
Damn has been characterized as conscious rap with elements of trap, R&B, and pop.

== Artwork and title ==
On April 11, 2017, Lamar revealed the cover artwork for Damn. The album cover was designed by Vlad Sepetov, who created the album covers for two of Lamar's projects – To Pimp a Butterfly and Untitled Unmastered. Sepetov described Damn's cover as "loud and abrasive" and "not uber political like To Pimp a Butterfly but it has energy". Sepetov went on to say the decision to put the Parental Advisory sticker in its unconventional position (near the center-right of the frame) was so it could be a part of the design instead of an "afterthought". Billboard listed the cover as one of the best of 2017, dubbing it "both meme-able and memorable".

In a radio interview on June 29, 2017, Lamar revealed the original title for the album was going to be What Happens on Earth Stays on Earth, but eventually settled on Damn. He stated the working title "didn't read right". Lamar went on to say about its final title, "There was so many different ways you could put it in my head. Damned if I do, damned if I don't. The loudness of the record. When I think about 'DNA', when I think of "Humble", when I think these records, it just felt like that."

== Release and promotion ==
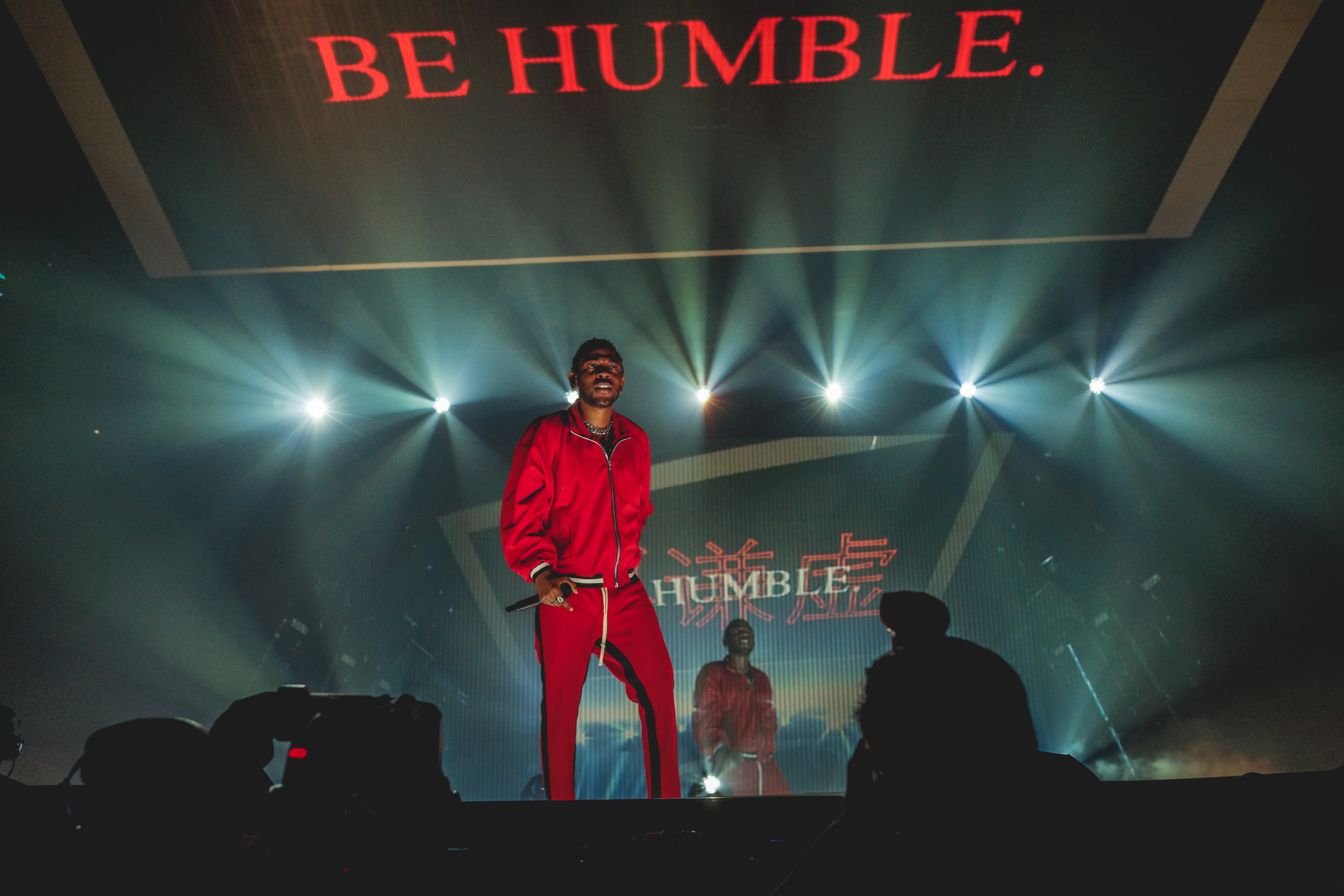
Lamar on The Damn Tour in 2017

On March 23, 2017, Lamar released a promotional single, "The Heart Part 4", which contained lyrics hinting at a possible April 7 release date for his fourth studio album. On April 7, 2017, the album was made available for pre-order and confirmed to be released on April 14. On April 11, Lamar revealed the track listing for Damn.

On December 8, 2017, Lamar released the Collectors Edition of the album. The album is the same musically, but has a reversed track order and new artwork.

=== Singles ===
On March 30, 2017, Lamar released the album's lead single, "Humble", accompanied by a music video. It reached number one on the US Billboard Hot 100 and number two on the Canadian Hot 100 chart. "Loyalty" featuring Rihanna, was released as the album's second single on June 20, 2017, to rhythmic and urban contemporary radio. The song peaked at number 14 on the Billboard Hot 100. "Love" featuring Zacari, was released as the album's third single on October 2, 2017, to rhythmic contemporary radio. It was released to contemporary hit radio on November 21, 2017. The song peaked at number 11 on the Billboard Hot 100.

=== Other songs ===
The music video for the song "DNA" was released on April 18, 2017. The song entered at number four on the Billboard Hot 100, becoming Lamar's second highest-charting song as a solo artist after "Humble".

The music video for the song, "Element", was released on June 27, 2017. The song peaked at number 16 on the Billboard Hot 100.

== Critical reception ==
Damn ratings
Aggregate scores
Source	Rating
AnyDecentMusic?	9.1/10
Metacritic	95/100
Review scores
Source	Rating
AllMusic	4.5/5 stars
The A.V. Club	A
Chicago Tribune	3.5/4 stars
The Daily Telegraph	5/5 stars
Entertainment Weekly	A
The Guardian	5/5 stars
NME	4/5 stars
Pitchfork	9.2/10
Rolling Stone	4.5/5 stars
Vice (Expert Witness)	A−

Damn was met with widespread critical acclaim. At Metacritic, which assigns a normalized rating out of 100 to reviews from professional publications, the album received an average score of 95, based on 39 reviews. Aggregator AnyDecentMusic? gave it 9.1 out of 10, based on their assessment of the critical consensus.

Andy Kellman of AllMusic stated that "it contains some of Lamar's best writing and performances, revealing his evolving complexity and versatility as a soul-baring lyricist and dynamic rapper". Christopher R. Weingarten, an author for Rolling Stone, said, "Much like the recent A Tribe Called Quest record, Damn. is a brilliant combination of the timeless and the modern, the old school and the next-level. The most gifted rapper of a generation stomps into the Nineties and continues to blaze a trail forward". In his review, Greg Kot of the Chicago Tribune states, "Damn. strips down the rhythms to their essence, flavored with the occasional cameo (notably Rihanna and U2). Lamar's voice does most of the heavy lifting, playing multiple roles and characters. His supple singing complements a variety of rap tones and textures". Jon Caramanica of The New York Times gave the album a positive review, calling it "Tart and punchy. ... Sometimes boisterous, sometimes swampy, rarely fanciful album—it's Mr. Lamar's version of the creeping paranoia that has become de rigueur for midcareer Drake. And yet this is likely Mr. Lamar's most jubilant album, the one in which his rhymes are the least tangled." Eric Renner Brown of Entertainment Weekly said, "After delving into the personal on 2012's Good Kid, M.A.A.D City and going broader on Butterfly, Lamar has found a middle ground on Damn. that yields some of his most emotionally resonant music yet".

Alexis Petridis of The Guardian wrote: "If it seems a more straightforward listen than To Pimp a Butterfly, there's a cheering sense that this doesn't equate to a lessening of musical ambition. There's none of that album's wilfully jarring quality – its sudden, anxious musical lurches and abrupt, short-circuiting leaps between genres – but the tracks on Damn still feel episodic and expansive. Whether Damn will have the same epochal impact as To Pimp a Butterfly remains to be seen, but either way it sounds like the work of a supremely confident artist at the top of his game." Neil McCormick of The Daily Telegraph stated that Damn "is the work of a future all-time great in full command of his powers". Leonie Cooper of NME said, "Damn. is by far his shortest release to date – but the ideas, thoughts and feelings it contains are massive, weighty things, from sexual tension to deep, dark depression". In Pitchfork's review of Damn, Matthew Trammell writes Damn "is a widescreen masterpiece of rap, full of expensive beats, furious rhymes, and peerless storytelling about Kendrick's destiny in America". Writing for The A.V. Club, Evan Rytlewski concluded, "Lamar trusts every idea to stand on its own. When you're making art this substantial, vital, and virtuosic, there's no need to wrap a tidy bow around it." In a mixed review, A. Harmony of Exclaim! wrote that Damn "is the first time in Lamar's career that he hasn't broken new ground, explored old themes in new ways or exhibited sonic growth".

=== Rankings ===
Select rankings of Damn
Publication	List	Rank	Ref.
The A.V. Club	The A.V. Club's 20 Best Albums of 2017	1	
The A.V. Club	50 Favorite Albums of the 2010s	11	
Billboard	Billboard's 50 Best Albums of 2017: Critics' Picks	1	
Billboard	The 100 Greatest Albums of the 2010s	48	
Complex	The Best Albums of 2017	1	
The Irish Times	Ticket Awards 2017: The Best Music of the Year	1	
Paste	The 50 Best Albums of 2017	2	
Paste	The 100 Best Albums of the 2010s	12	
Pitchfork	The 50 Best Albums of 2017	1	
Pitchfork	The 200 Best Albums of the 2010s	57	
Rolling Stone	50 Best Albums of 2017	1	
Rolling Stone	500 Greatest Albums of All Time	175	
Rolling Stone	The 200 Greatest Hip-Hop Albums of All Time	60	
Rolling Stone	The 250 Greatest Albums of the 21st Century So Far	66	
Stereogum	The 50 Best Albums of 2017	2	
Stereogum	The 100 Best Albums of the 2010s	11	
The Village Voice	Pazz & Jop Music Critics' Poll	1	
The Wire	Releases of the Year 1–50	41	

=== Industry awards ===
Awards and nominations for Damn
Year	Ceremony	Category	Result	Ref.
2017	American Music Awards	Favorite Rap/Hip-Hop Album	Won	
2017	BET Hip Hop Awards	Album of the Year	Won	
2017	Danish Music Awards	International Album of the Year	Won	
2017	Q Awards	Best Album	Nominated	
2018	Fonogram Awards	Best Foreign Rap or Hip-Hop Album of the Year	Won	
2018	Grammy Awards	Album of the Year	Nominated	
2018	Grammy Awards	Best Rap Album	Won	
2018	iHeartRadio Music Awards	Hip-Hop Album of the Year	Won	
2018	Juno Awards	International Album of the Year	Won	
2018	NAACP Image Awards	Outstanding Album	Won	
2018	Pulitzer Prizes	Pulitzer Prize for Music	Won	

== Commercial performance ==
In the United States, Damn debuted at number one on the Billboard 200 with 603,000 album-equivalent units in its first week of release, becoming his third consecutive album after To Pimp a Butterfly and Untitled Unmastered to reach the nation's summit. It sold 353,000 copies in its first week and accumulated over 340 million streams. In its second week, the album remained at the top of the US charts with 238,000 album-equivalent units of which 87,000 were traditional album sales, bringing the sales to a total of 841,000 units. In its third week, the album continued to top the charts with 173,000 album-equivalent units of which 57,000 were traditional album sales, bringing the sales to a total of 1.014 million units. As of April 2018, Damn had sold 1,002,000 copies and earned 3,137,000 album-equivalent units in the US.

On May 10, 2018, the album was certified triple platinum by the Recording Industry Association of America (RIAA) for combined sales, streaming and track-sales equivalent of 3 million units. The album also opened atop the Canadian Albums Chart with 35,000 consumption units and 25.4 million streams, becoming the rapper's third consecutive album to arrive at number one. In the United Kingdom, Damn sold 30,000 units in its first week and entered at number two on the UK Albums Chart.

According to IFPI, it was the seventh best selling album of 2017, with 1.3 million copies shipped globally. Damn was ranked as the number one album of the year on the Billboard 200 in 2017. In 2018, Damn was ranked as the thirteenth most popular album of the year on the Billboard 200.

== Track listing ==
Damn track listing
No.	Title	Writer(s)	Producer(s)	Length
1.	"Blood"	Kendrick Duckworth; Daniel Tannenbaum; Anthony Tiffith	Bekon; Top Dawg	1:58
2.	"DNA"	Duckworth; Michael Williams II	Mike Will Made It	3:05
3.	"Yah"	Duckworth; Mark Spears; Dacoury Natche; Tiffith	Sounwave; DJ Dahi; Top Dawg; Bekon^{[a]}	2:40
4.	"Element"	Duckworth; Spears; James Blake; Ricci Riera	Sounwave; Blake; Riera; Tae Beast^{[a]}; Bekon^{[a]}	3:28
5.	"Feel"	Duckworth; Spears	Sounwave	3:34
6.	"Loyalty" (featuring Rihanna)	Duckworth; Natche; Spears; Robyn Fenty; Terrace Martin; Tiffith; Bruno Mars; Philip Lawrence; Christopher Brody Brown; Russell Jones; Robert Diggs; Shawn Carter; Malik Cox; Calvin Broadus; Ricardo Thomas	DJ Dahi; Sounwave; Martin; Top Dawg; Kuk Harrell^{[c]}	3:47
7.	"Pride"	Duckworth; Steve Lacy; Anna Wise; Tiffith	Lacy; Top Dawg; Bekon^{[a]}	4:35
8.	"Humble"	Duckworth; Williams II; Asheton Hogan	Mike Will Made It; Pluss^{[b]}	2:57
9.	"Lust"	Duckworth; Natche; Spears; Chester Hansen; Alexander Sowinski; Matthew Tavares; Leland Whitty	DJ Dahi; Sounwave; BadBadNotGood	5:07
10.	"Love" (featuring Zacari)	Duckworth; Zacari Pacaldo; Travis Walton; Spears; Greg Kurstin; Tiffith	Teddy Walton; Sounwave; Kurstin; Top Dawg	3:33
11.	"XXX" (featuring U2)	Duckworth; Williams II; Natche; Spears; Tiffith; Paul Hewson; David Evans; Adam Clayton; Larry Mullen Jr.	Mike Will Made It; DJ Dahi; Sounwave; Top Dawg; Bekon^{[a]}	4:14
12.	"Fear"	Duckworth; Daniel Maman; Dale Warren	The Alchemist; Bekon^{[a]}	7:40
13.	"God"	Duckworth; Riera; Spears; Natche; Tannenbaum; Ronald LaTour; Tiffith; Daveon Jackson; Mike Hector; Walton; Brock Korsan	Riera; Sounwave; DJ Dahi; Bekon; Cardo; Top Dawg; Yung Exclusive^{[b]}; Hector^{[b]}; Walton^{[b]}	4:08
14.	"Duckworth"	Duckworth; Patrick Douthit; Nai Palm; Don Robey; Joe Scott; Bill Curtis	9th Wonder; Bekon^{[a]}	4:08
Total length:				54:54

Notes

- ^{^[a]} signifies an additional producer
- ^{^[b]} signifies an uncredited co-producer
- ^{^[c]} signifies a vocal producer
- Every song is stylized in all caps with a period at the end of their titles, including featured artist credits. For example, "Yah" is stylized as "YAH."
- Some CD pressings of the album have slight differences: "Pride" runs for 4 minutes and 31 seconds (4:31), "Love" runs for 3 minutes and 31 seconds (3:31), and "Fear" runs for 6 minutes and 54 seconds (6:54), bringing the total album length to 54 minutes and 2 seconds (54:02). This version of the album also features slightly different mixing.

Sample credits

- "Blood" and "DNA" contain elements of Fox News commentators Eric Bolling, Kimberly Guilfoyle and Geraldo Rivera criticizing Lamar's 2015 BET Awards performance.
- "Feel" contains a sample of "Stormy", written and performed by O. C. Smith; and an interpolation from "Don't Let Me Down", written and performed by Fleurie.
- "Loyalty" contains samples of "24K Magic", written by Bruno Mars, Christopher Brody Brown, and Philip Lawrence, as performed by Bruno Mars; "Shimmy Shimmy Ya", written by Russell Jones and Robert Diggs, as performed by Ol' Dirty Bastard; and "Get Your Mind Right Mami", written by Shawn Carter, Cordozar Calvin Broadus Jr., Malik Cox, and Ricardo Thomas, as performed by Jay-Z featuring Snoop Dogg and Memphis Bleek.
- "XXX" contains samples of "America", written by Daniel Tannenbaum, Tyler Reese, Sergiu Gherman, Richard Michael McRae, Kendrick Duckworth, Daniel Krieger, Craig Balmoris, and Alexander Botwin, and performed by Bekon; and "American Soul", written and performed by U2, featuring Lamar himself.
- "Fear" contains a sample of "Poverty's Paradise", written by Dale Warren and performed by 24-Carat Black.
- "God" contains a sample of "End of the World", written and performed by Illmind.
- "Duckworth" contains samples of "Atari", written by Nai Palm and performed by Hiatus Kaiyote; "Be Ever Wonderful", written by Don Robey and Joe Scott, as performed by Ted Taylor; "Ostavi Trag", written by September; and "Let the Drums Speak", written by Bill Curtis and performed by the Fatback Band.

== Personnel ==
Adapted from the album liner notes and AllMusic.

Production and music

- 9th Wonder – production ("Duckworth")
- Anna Wise – additional vocals ("Pride")
- Alan "The Alchemist" Maman – producer ("Fear")
- Bekon – additional vocals ("Blood", "Yah", "Pride", "XXX", "Fear", "God", "Duckworth")
- Carl Duckworth – additional vocals ("Fear")
- Charles Edward Sydney Isom Jr. – additional vocals ("Fear")
- Chelsea Blythe – additional vocals ("Feel")
- DJ Dahi – additional vocals ("Loyalty")
- Dave Free – associate producer
- Dr. Dre – executive producer
- Kamasi Washington – strings ("Lust")
- Kaytranada – additional vocals ("Lust")
- Kendrick Lamar – vocals; additional keys ("XXX")
- Kid Capri – additional vocals ("Element", "Love", "XXX", "Duckworth")
- Kuk Harrell – vocal production for Rihanna
- Matt Schaeffer – guitar ("Humble"); additional guitar ("DNA", "Feel")
- Mike Hector – additional drums ("God")
- Rat Boy – additional vocals ("Lust")
- Steve Lacy – background vocals, production ("Pride")
- Thundercat – bass ("Feel")

Technical

- Blake Harden – recording ("Lust", "Duckworth") at Windmark Studios
- Brendan Silas Perry – additional recording ("Element", "Love", "Duckworth")
- Cyrus Taghipour – mix assistant
- Derek "MixedByAli" Ali – mixing
- James Hunt – engineer, mixing ("Element")
- Marcos Tovar – vocal recording for Rihanna (at Windmark Studios)
- Matt Schaeffer – engineer ("Humble"); mixing ("Element")
- Mike Bozzi – mastering at Bernie Grundman in Hollywood, California
- Sounwave – mixing ("Feel")
- Tyler Page – mix assistant
- Zeke Mishanec – additional recording ("Element", "Love", "Duckworth")

Art

- Dave Free – creative direction, photography
- Kendrick Lamar – creative direction
- Roberto Reyes – photography
- Vladimir Sepetov – creative direction

== Charts ==
=== Weekly charts ===
2017 chart performance for Damn
Chart (2017)	Peak position
Australian Albums (ARIA)	2
Australian Urban Albums (ARIA)	1
Austrian Albums (Ö3 Austria)	6
Belgian Albums (Ultratop Flanders)	2
Belgian Albums (Ultratop Wallonia)	16
Canadian Albums (Billboard)	1
Czech Albums (ČNS IFPI)	3
Danish Albums (Hitlisten)	2
Dutch Albums (Album Top 100)	2
Finnish Albums (Suomen virallinen lista)	3
French Albums (SNEP)	3
German Albums (Offizielle Top 100)	6
Hungarian Albums (MAHASZ)	33
Irish Albums (Official Charts)	2
Italian Albums (FIMI)	15
Japanese Albums (Oricon)	55
Latvian Albums (LaIPA)	7
New Zealand Albums (RMNZ)	2
Norwegian Albums (VG-lista)	2
Polish Albums (ZPAV)	24
Portuguese Albums (AFP)	5
Scottish Albums (Official Charts)	3
South Korean Albums International (Gaon)	3
Slovak Albums (IFPI)	1
Spanish Albums (Promusicae)	15
Swedish Albums (Sverigetopplistan)	2
Swiss Albums (Schweizer Hitparade)	3
UK Albums (Official Charts)	2
UK R&B Albums (Official Charts)	1
US Billboard 200	1
US Top R&B/Hip-Hop Albums (Billboard)	1

2025 chart performance for Damn
Chart (2025)	Position
Icelandic Albums (Tónlistinn)	28
Nigerian Albums (TurnTable)	88
Polish Albums (ZPAV)	22

=== Year-end charts ===
Year-end chart performance
Chart (2017)	Position
Australian Albums (ARIA)	10
Belgian Albums (Ultratop Flanders)	25
Belgian Albums (Ultratop Wallonia)	136
Canadian Albums (Billboard)	5
Danish Albums (Hitlisten)	13
Dutch Albums (MegaCharts)	17
French Albums (SNEP)	69
German Albums (Offizielle Top 100)	87
Icelandic Albums (Tónlistinn)	15
Italian Albums (FIMI)	68
New Zealand Albums (RMNZ)	8
Swedish Albums (Sverigetopplistan)	11
Swiss Albums (Schweizer Hitparade)	89
UK Albums (OCC)	27
US Billboard 200	1
US Top R&B/Hip-Hop Albums (Billboard)	1

Year-end chart performance
Chart (2018)	Position
Australian Albums (ARIA)	37
Canadian Albums (Billboard)	20
Danish Albums (Hitlisten)	44
French Albums (SNEP)	168
Icelandic Albums (Tónlistinn)	50
New Zealand Albums (RMNZ)	23
South Korean International Albums (Gaon)	34
Swedish Albums (Sverigetopplistan)	55
UK Albums (OCC)	76
US Billboard 200	13
US Top R&B/Hip-Hop Albums (Billboard)	9

Year-end chart performance
Chart (2019)	Position
Australian Albums (ARIA)	91
Belgian Albums (Ultratop Flanders)	167
US Billboard 200	55
US Top R&B/Hip-Hop Albums (Billboard)	24

Year-end chart performance
Chart (2020)	Position
Belgian Albums (Ultratop Flanders)	171
US Billboard 200	84
US Top R&B/Hip-Hop Albums (Billboard)	72

Year-end chart performance
Chart (2021)	Position
Icelandic Albums (Tónlistinn)	98
US Billboard 200	82
US Top R&B/Hip-Hop Albums (Billboard)	59

Year-end chart performance
Chart (2022)	Position
Australian Albums (ARIA)	72
Belgian Albums (Ultratop Flanders)	129
Icelandic Albums (Tónlistinn)	60
Lithuanian Albums (AGATA)	46
US Billboard 200	52
US Top R&B/Hip-Hop Albums (Billboard)	24

Year-end chart performance
Chart (2023)	Position
Australian Albums (ARIA)	63
Belgian Albums (Ultratop Flanders)	109
Belgian Albums (Ultratop Wallonia)	187
Icelandic Albums (Tónlistinn)	43
New Zealand Albums (RMNZ)	39
US Billboard 200	41
US Top R&B/Hip-Hop Albums (Billboard)	17

Year-end chart performance
Chart (2024)	Position
Australian Albums (ARIA)	56
Australian Hip Hop/R&B Albums (ARIA)	14
Belgian Albums (Ultratop Flanders)	75
Belgian Albums (Ultratop Wallonia)	166
Canadian Albums (Billboard)	50
Dutch Albums (Album Top 100)	83
Icelandic Albums (Tónlistinn)	42
US Billboard 200	39
US Top R&B/Hip-Hop Albums (Billboard)	10

Year-end chart performance
Chart (2025)	Position
Australian Albums (ARIA)	85
Belgian Albums (Ultratop Flanders)	83
Belgian Albums (Ultratop Wallonia)	162
Icelandic Albums (Tónlistinn)	84
US Billboard 200	45
US Top R&B/Hip-Hop Albums (Billboard)	12

=== Decade-end charts ===
Decade-end chart performance
Chart (2010–2019)	Position
US Billboard 200	10

== Certifications and sales ==
Certifications and sales
Region	Certification	Certified units/sales
Australia (ARIA)	3× Platinum	210,000^{‡}
Austria (IFPI Austria)	Platinum	15,000^{‡}
Belgium (BRMA)	2× Platinum	60,000^{‡}
Canada (Music Canada)	4× Platinum	320,000^{‡}
Chile	Gold	5,000
Denmark (IFPI Danmark)	4× Platinum	80,000^{‡}
France (SNEP)	2× Platinum	200,000^{‡}
Germany (BVMI)	Gold	100,000^{‡}
Iceland (FHF)	Gold	4,946
Italy (FIMI)	Platinum	50,000^{‡}
Mexico (AMPROFON)	Gold	30,000^{‡}
Netherlands (NVPI)	Gold	20,000^{‡}
New Zealand (RMNZ)	7× Platinum	105,000^{‡}
Norway (IFPI Norway)	Platinum	30,000^{‡}
Poland (ZPAV)	2× Platinum	40,000^{‡}
Portugal (AFP)	Gold	3,500^{‡}
Singapore (RIAS)	Gold	5,000^{*}
Sweden (GLF)	Gold	20,000^{‡}
United Kingdom (BPI)	2× Platinum	600,000^{‡}
United States (RIAA)	3× Platinum	3,000,000^{‡}
^{*} Sales figures based on certification alone.^{‡} Sales+streaming figures based on certification alone.

== Release history ==
Release dates and formats
Region	Date	Label(s)	Format(s)	Edition	Ref.
Various	April 14, 2017	TDE; Aftermath; Interscope	Digital download; streaming	Standard	
Various	April 21, 2017	TDE; Aftermath; Interscope	CD	Standard	
Japan	May 24, 2017	Universal Music Japan	CD	Standard	
Various	July 14, 2017	TDE; Aftermath; Interscope	Vinyl LP	Standard	
Various	December 8, 2017	TDE; Aftermath; Interscope	Digital download; streaming; CD	Collectors Edition	
Japan	July 18, 2018	Universal Music Japan	CD	Collectors Edition	

== See also ==
- List of Billboard 200 number-one albums of 2017
- List of number-one albums of 2017 (Canada)
- 2017 in music
- 2017 in hip-hop
