= Love (Kendrick Lamar song) =

Single by Kendrick Lamar featuring Zacari

from the album Damn
- Released: October 2, 2017
- Recorded: 2016
- Studio: No Excuses (Santa Monica); Jungle City (Manhattan)
- Genre: Pop rap; R&B; new-age
- Length: 3:33
- Label: Top Dawg Entertainment; Aftermath; Interscope
- Songwriters: Kendrick Duckworth; Zacari Pacaldo; Travis Walton; Mark Spears; Greg Kurstin; Anthony Tiffith
- Producers: Teddy Walton; Sounwave; Greg Kurstin; Top Dawg

Kendrick Lamar singles chronology
"New Freezer" (2017)	"Love" (2017)	"All the Stars" (2018)

Zacari singles chronology
"Love" (2017)	"Don't Trip" (2019)

Music video
- "Love" on YouTube

"Love" (stylized as "LOVE.") is a song by American rapper Kendrick Lamar featuring American singer Zacari, taken from the former's fourth studio album Damn (2017). It was released to US rhythmic contemporary radio by Top Dawg Entertainment, Aftermath Entertainment, and Interscope Records on October 2, 2017, as the third and final single from the album. Lamar and Zacari wrote the song with its producers Teddy Walton, Sounwave, Greg Kurstin, and Anthony "Top Dawg" Tiffith.

Titled after the emotion it addresses, "Love" is a ballad that finds Lamar expressing his unconditional love for his significant other. Its lyricism incorporates a fragmented stream of consciousness, inside jokes and nostalgic experiences. Musically, it is a 1980s-inspired pop rap and new-age song that features delicate synthesizers and thundering trap drum beats in its vast production. The track was complimented by music critics for its intimate songwriting, catchiness and comforting tone.

"Love" peaked within the top 40 of Australia, Canada, Ireland, New Zealand, Portugal, Slovakia, and the United Kingdom. In the United States the song reached number 11 on the Billboard Hot 100 and topped the R&B/Hip-Hop Airplay and Rhythmic Airplay charts. An accompanying music video for "Love", directed by Dave Meyers and the Little Homies, was released on December 21, 2017. The song has been certified four times platinum by the Recording Industry Association of America (RIAA). Lamar has performed "Love" on four of his concert tours: the Damn Tour (2017–2018), the Championship Tour (2018), the Big Steppers Tour (2022–2023) and Grand National Tour (2025) with SZA doing the backup vocals.

== Background and production ==
During his cover story with T: The New York Times Style Magazine on March 1, 2017, Kendrick Lamar confirmed that he was in the middle of finishing a new album. He released the promotional single "The Heart Part 4" on March 23, and further hinted at a new album with the line: "Y'all got 'till April the 7th to get y'all shit together." After an untitled project was made available for pre-order, Lamar formally announced his fourth studio album, Damn, on April 11, with a scheduled release date of April 14. Its artwork, tracklist and featured artists were revealed on the same day.

Zacari and Lamar first appeared on a song from Isaiah Rashad's debut album The Sun's Tirade (2016), but did not meet in person until after the album was released. Before their meeting, Zacari was working with Teddy Walton on material for his own project. He was promised by his manager, Anthony "Moosa" Tiffith Jr., that he would join Lamar for a recording session towards the end of 2016. When they met, Watson played about four of the songs he was working on with Zacari for Lamar. He was animated for the first three tracks, but went quiet when the final song was played. Following the meeting, he asked for the stems to the last record. Matt Schaeffer and James Hunt recorded "Love" at No Excuses in Santa Monica, California, with additional recording handled by Zeke Mishanec and Brendan Silas Perry. Derek "MixedByAli" Ali mixed the song with assistance from Tyler Page and Cyprus Nois Taghipour. Additional vocals provided by Kid Capri were recorded at Jungle City Studios in Manhattan. Zacari did not learn that the song was going to be included on Damn until three months before it was set to be released.

== Composition ==
"Love" is the tenth track on the standard version of Damn, and the fifth track on its collector's edition. It has a length of three minutes and 33 seconds. The song is set in the key of F major with a fairly slow tempo of 63 beats per minute. Walton, Sounwave, Greg Kurstin and Anthony "Top Dawg" Tiffith produced the song and composed its instrumentals with Lamar and Zacari. It implements a tonic–subdominant chord progression that Mitch Findlay from HotNewHipHop noted is not often used in hip hop songwriting. The "wandering quality" of the progression enhances the song's "detached whimsy." Lamar and Zacari's vocals span from F_{3} to C_{6}.

Described as a "psychedelic concoction" by Rap-Up and "a whole new genre" by Zacari, "Love" is a pop rap and new-age ballad with strong elements of R&B. It is evocative of a "high school dance in the mid-1980s." Gliding synthesizers and stuttering trap rhythms magnify its "atmospheric" soundscape and touches the borders of cloud rap, according to Findlay. As Zacari uses a "soaring" falsetto in the refrain, Lamar uses his "unconventional" cadence as an additional instrument to "build on the existing harmony." Rolling Stone journalists noted that gentle synth swells were incorporated in its "spacious" and "tender" production. Some critics believed the song's vocal melodies and mainstream radio appeal were similar to the works of Drake, while others were reminded of Enya's instrumentations.

"Love" serves as the successor to "Lust" on the standard version of Damn, and its precursor on the collector's edition. Its opening line ponders on the accompanying emotions the two tracks further address. The songwriting was inspired by Lamar's teenage experiences of understanding love and attraction for the first time, while Zacari's writing was influenced by previous platonic relationships. Findlay pointed out that throughout the song, Lamar is "not looking to impress, but rather to express" his unconditional love towards his significant other. His fragmented stream of consciousness uses inside jokes and nostalgic experiences to paint a "series of personal snapshots;" references used include Mike Tyson, 50 Cent's "21 Questions" (2003), and Young Dro's "Shoulder Lean" (2006). "Love" is presumed to be a dedication to Lamar's life partner, beautician Whitney Alford. The lyrics, "I want your body, your music / I bought the big one to prove it", have been alluded to the couple's engagement, which was announced in April 2015.

== Critical reception ==
"Love" has received generally positive reviews from music critics. It was included in Billboard and Complex's lists of the best hip hop love songs. Writing for PopMatters, Dave Heaton described "Love" as a "delicate" and "lush" moment of comfort amidst the "extreme, dark emotions" of Damn. Clover Hope for Jezebel praised how Lamar "endearingly embraces simplicity" with his songwriting and how its structure represented the parent album's "smooth contours." NPR Music's Daoud Tyler-Ameen was stunned to hear Lamar sound so "earnest and unguarded" throughout his "smooth and taunt" vocal performance. He hailed the song as Damn's "revelation" that he keeps revisiting.

Christopher Hooton of The Independent found "Love" to be a "saccharine-synthed, straight up wet track" that "just makes no sense" being on Damn. Spin's Brian Josephs echoed his sentiments, describing the song's balladry as "out-of-place in its wistfulness." In a review for Exclaim!, A. Harmony did not consider "Love" to be impactful enough to warrant many listens, which she finds to be "unusual" for Lamar: "Forgettable isn't typically his style."

== Commercial performance ==
"Love" debuted at number 18 on the US Billboard Hot 100 chart in the first week of Damn's release. Following its release as a single, it re-entered the chart at number 41 for the week ending December 2, 2017, and moved up to number 27 the following week. After its accompanying music video was released, "Love" reached its peak at number 11. It has spent 40 weeks on the Billboard Hot 100, before departing the chart on April 14, 2018. On the R&B/Hip-Hop Airplay chart, "Love" became Lamar's first number-one single as a lead artist. It also became his first number-one song on the Rhythmic Airplay chart.

== Music video ==
Dave Meyers and the Little Homies, composed of Lamar and Dave Free, directed the music video for "Love". It was released on Lamar's Vevo channel on December 21, 2017. The video chronicles a loving and "tense" relationship between Lamar and his lover. They are seen making love, talking, arguing, and separating from the perspective of a kitchen table; a reference to photographer Carrie Mae Weems' "Kitchen Table Series" (1990). Following their split, Lamar attempts to overcome lustful desires, such as being tempted by the presence of multiple women at a music video shoot, and reconcile with his lover. An easter egg teasing Lamar's involvement on the soundtrack album of the superhero film Black Panther (2018) is shown on a clapperboard during the shoot. The video also features a cameo from American rapper Travis Scott sitting on a flight of stairs during the second verse.

== Live performances and covers ==
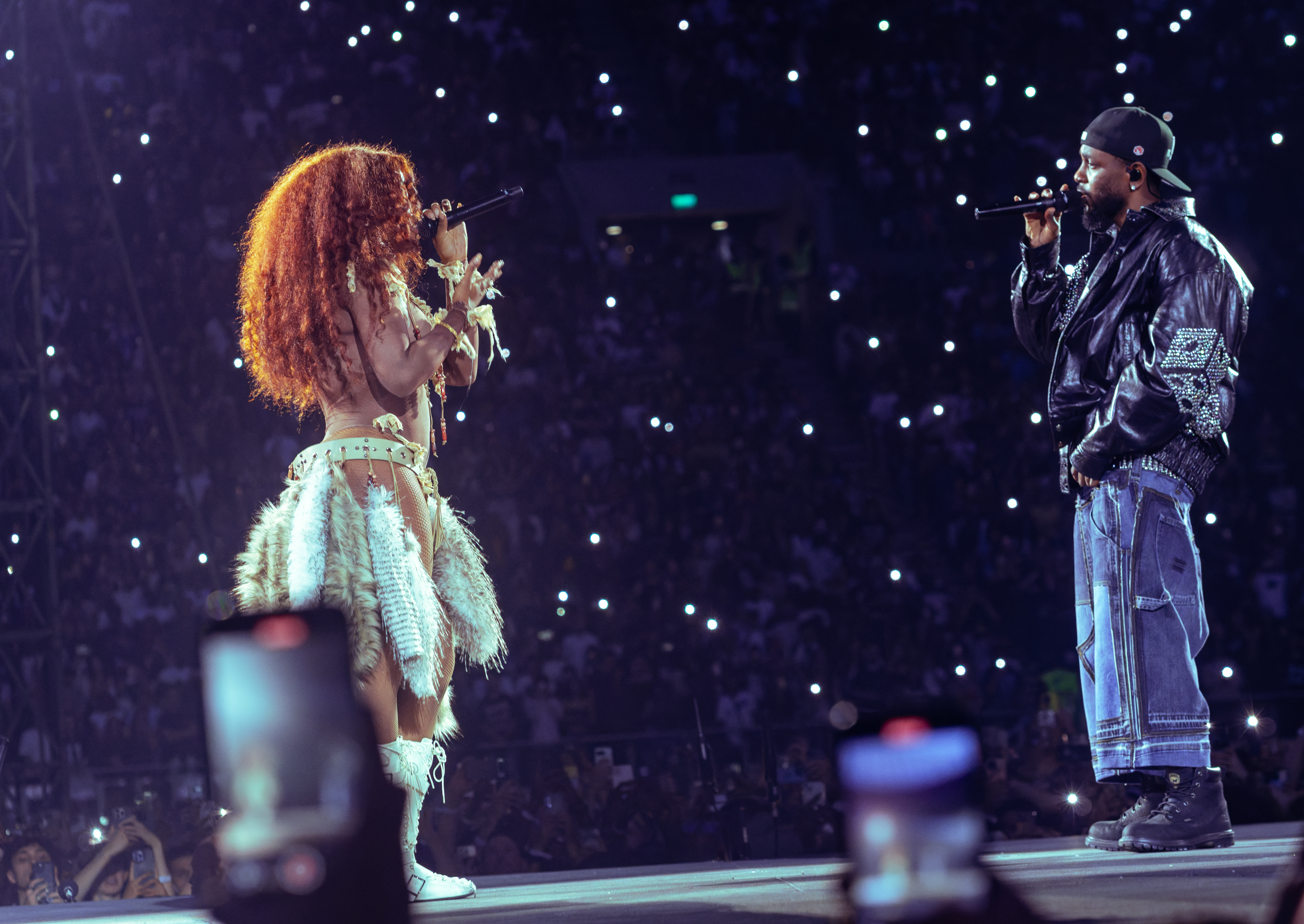
Lamar performing "Love" during the Grand National Tour with SZA, who covered Zacari's verses

Lamar performed "Love" for the first time as an encore during his headlining performance at Coachella on April 16 and 23, 2017. The song was included on the set list for the Damn Tour (2017–2018), the Championship Tour (2018) and the Big Steppers Tour (2022–2023). Synth-pop band Chvrches covered "Love" on Triple J's Like a Version in July 2018. In 2025, singer-songwriter SZA covered Zacari's lines every time Lamar performed the song with her during the Grand National Tour, which they co-headlined.

== Personnel ==
Credits adapted from the liner notes of Damn.

- Kendrick Lamar – primary vocals, songwriter
- Zacari – featured vocals, songwriter
- Kid Capri – additional vocals
- Teddy Walton – songwriter, producer
- Sounwave – songwriter, producer
- Greg Kurstin – songwriter, producer
- Anthony Tiffith – songwriter, producer
- Derek Ali – mixing
- Tyler Page – assistant mixing engineer
- Cyrus Taghipour – assistant mixing engineer
- Matt Schaeffer – recording
- James Hunt – recording
- Zeke Mishanec – additional recording engineer
- Brendan Silas Perry – additional recording engineer

== Charts ==
=== Weekly charts ===
Chart (2017–2018)	Peak position
Australia (ARIA)	29
Australia Urban (ARIA)	5
Austria (Ö3 Austria Top 40)	62
Canada Hot 100 (Billboard)	22
Czech Republic Singles Digital (ČNS IFPI)	73
France (SNEP)	88
Germany (GfK)	86
Ireland (IRMA)	32
Netherlands (Single Top 100)	58
New Zealand (Recorded Music NZ)	24
Portugal (AFP)	26
Slovakia Singles Digital (ČNS IFPI)	43
Sweden (Sverigetopplistan)	58
UK Singles (Official Charts)	39
US Billboard Hot 100	11
US Hot R&B/Hip-Hop Songs (Billboard)	6
US Hot Rap Songs (Billboard)	5
US Pop Airplay (Billboard)	18
US Adult R&B Songs (Billboard)	23
US Rhythmic Airplay (Billboard)	1

Chart (2025)	Peak position
Global 200 (Billboard)	139

=== Year-end charts ===
Chart (2017)	Position
US Hot R&B/Hip-Hop Songs (Billboard)	49
US Streaming Songs (Billboard)	72
Chart (2018)	Position
US Billboard Hot 100	50
US Hot R&B/Hip-Hop Songs (Billboard)	36
US Rhythmic (Billboard)	12

== Certifications ==
Region	Certification	Certified units/sales
Australia (ARIA)	7× Platinum	490,000^{‡}
Austria (IFPI Austria)	Gold	15,000^{‡}
Brazil (Pro-Música Brasil)	Platinum	60,000^{‡}
Canada (Music Canada)	5× Platinum	400,000^{‡}
Denmark (IFPI Danmark)	Platinum	90,000^{‡}
France (SNEP)	Platinum	200,000^{‡}
Italy (FIMI)	Gold	50,000^{‡}
New Zealand (RMNZ)	6× Platinum	180,000^{‡}
Poland (ZPAV)	Gold	25,000^{‡}
United Kingdom (BPI)	Platinum	600,000^{‡}
United States (RIAA)	4× Platinum	4,000,000^{‡}
^{‡} Sales+streaming figures based on certification alone.

== Release history ==
Country	Date	Format	Label	Ref.
United States	October 2, 2017	Rhythmic contemporary radio	Top Dawg; Aftermath; Interscope	
United States	November 21, 2017	Contemporary hit radio	Top Dawg; Aftermath; Interscope	
