= The Damn Tour =

2017–2018 concert tour by Kendrick Lamar

- Tour by Kendrick Lamar
- Promotional poster for the tour
- Location: Asia; Europe; North America; Oceania
- Associated album: Damn
- Start date: July 7, 2017
- End date: July 30, 2018
- Legs: 4
- No. of shows: 64
- Supporting acts: Anderson .Paak; Dead Obies; Travis Scott; DRAM; YG; James Blake; SiR
- Attendance: 700,746 (52 shows)
- Box office: $62.7 million (52 shows)

Kendrick Lamar concert chronology
- Kunta Groove Sessions Tour (2015); The Damn Tour (2017–18); The Championship Tour (2018)

The Damn Tour (stylized as The DAMN. Tour) was a concert tour by American rapper and songwriter Kendrick Lamar, in support of his fourth studio album, Damn (2017). The tour's North American leg began on July 12, 2017, in Glendale, Arizona and ended on September 2, 2017, in Miami. The European leg of the tour started on February 7, 2018, in Dublin and concluded on March 5, 2018, in Berlin. The tour's Oceanian tour started on July 10, 2018, in Perth, and concluded on July 30, 2018, in Seoul.

According to Pollstar, The Damn Tour grossed $41.4 million with 452,387 tickets sold in 36 shows only in North America.

== Background ==
Following a pair of Coachella gigs and a performance at Quebec City Summer Festival, the rapper brought his new album on the road in the summer of 2017. The first announcement had 17 dates across North America slowly adding to 20 after adding shows in Brooklyn and Los Angeles having Travis Scott and DRAM as the opening acts. The second announcement added 15 shows having YG as the opening act. On September 30, he added a leg of European dates to the tour with James Blake as the opening act. On April 29, 2018, he added a leg of Oceanian dates to the tour.

== Set list ==
This set list is representative of the show on July 12, 2017, in Glendale. It is not representative of all concerts for the duration of the tour.

1. "DNA."
2. "ELEMENT."
3. "King Kunta"
4. "untitled 07 | 2014 – 2016"
5. "untitled 02 | 06.23.2014."
6. "Mask Off" (Future remix)
7. "Collard Greens"
8. "Swimming Pools (Drank)"
9. "Backseat Freestyle"
10. "LOYALTY."
11. "LUST."
12. "Money Trees"
13. "m.A.A.d City"
14. "XXX."
15. "PRIDE."
16. "LOVE."
17. "Bitch, Don't Kill My Vibe"
18. "Alright"
19. "HUMBLE."

Encore

20. "FEEL."
21. "GOD."

=== Special guests ===
- July 23, 2017 – Brooklyn: "4 AM" with 2 Chainz and Travis Scott
- July 26, 2017 – Auburn Hills: "Deja Vu", "A Tale of 2 Citiez" & "No Role Modelz" with J. Cole
- July 27, 2017 – Chicago: "No Problem" with Chance the Rapper
- August 9, 2017 – Los Angeles: "That Part" with Schoolboy Q, "Money Trees" with Jay Rock, "Love Galore" with SZA, "Look at Me!" with XXXTentacion.

== Shows ==
List of concerts, showing date, city, country, venue, opening acts, tickets sold, number of available tickets and amount of gross revenue
Date	City	Country	Venue	Opening acts	Attendance	Revenue
Leg 1 — North America
July 7, 2017 (Note: This concert was a part of the Quebec City Summer Festival 2017.)	Quebec City	Canada	Plains of Abraham	Anderson .Paak; Dead Obies	—N/a	—N/a
July 12, 2017	Glendale	United States	Gila River Arena	Travis Scott; DRAM	12,986 / 13,184	$1,050,060
July 14, 2017	Dallas	United States	American Airlines Center	Travis Scott; DRAM	13,362 / 13,362	$1,352,113
July 15, 2017	Houston	United States	Toyota Center	Travis Scott; DRAM	11,441 / 11,441	$1,249,664
July 17, 2017	Duluth	United States	Infinite Energy Arena	Travis Scott; DRAM	9,846 / 9,846	$943,090
July 19, 2017	Philadelphia	United States	Wells Fargo Center	Travis Scott; DRAM	13,513 / 13,742	$1,330,647
July 20, 2017	Brooklyn	United States	Barclays Center	Travis Scott; DRAM	28,174 / 28,174 (Note: The score data is combined from the shows held at the Barclays Center on July 20 and July 23, respectively.)	$3,074,047
July 21, 2017	Washington, D.C.	United States	Verizon Center	DRAM	12,944 / 13,186	$1,375,048
July 22, 2017	Boston	United States	TD Garden	Travis Scott; DRAM	12,773 / 12,889	$1,400,540
July 23, 2017	Brooklyn	United States	Barclays Center	Travis Scott; DRAM		
July 25, 2017	Toronto	Canada	Air Canada Centre	Travis Scott; DRAM	26,473 / 26,473 (Note: The score data is combined from the shows held at the Air Canada Centre on July 25 and August 23, respectively.)	$2,599,580
July 26, 2017	Auburn Hills	United States	The Palace of Auburn Hills	Travis Scott; DRAM	13,070 / 13,173	$1,301,448
July 27, 2017	Chicago	United States	United Center	Travis Scott; DRAM	24,727 / 26,316 (Note: The score data is combined from the shows held at the United Center on July 27 and August 20, respectively.)	$2,415,331
July 29, 2017	Denver	United States	Pepsi Center	Travis Scott; DRAM	13,140 / 13,266	$1,154,190
August 1, 2017	Tacoma	United States	Tacoma Dome	Travis Scott; DRAM	18,590 / 18,590	$1,278,663
August 2, 2017	Vancouver	Canada	Rogers Arena	Travis Scott; DRAM	13,938 / 13,938	$1,228,590
August 4, 2017	Oakland	United States	Oracle Arena	Travis Scott; DRAM	14,179 / 14,179	$1,373,996
August 5, 2017	Las Vegas	United States	T-Mobile Arena	Travis Scott; DRAM	14,499 / 14,499	$1,439,417
August 6, 2017	Los Angeles	United States	Staples Center	Travis Scott; DRAM	40,425 / 40,425	$3,847,175
August 8, 2017	Los Angeles	United States	Staples Center	Travis Scott; DRAM	40,425 / 40,425	$3,847,175
August 9, 2017	Los Angeles	United States	Staples Center	Travis Scott; DRAM	40,425 / 40,425	$3,847,175
August 11, 2017	Anaheim	United States	Honda Center	YG; DRAM	12,275 / 14,443	$1,181,276
August 12, 2017	San Jose	United States	SAP Center	YG; DRAM	12,713 / 12,971	$1,239,832
August 13, 2017	Sacramento	United States	Golden 1 Center	YG; DRAM	11,191 / 12,272	$896,190
August 16, 2017	Kansas City	United States	Sprint Center	YG; DRAM	10,560 / 11,161	$728,344
August 18, 2017	Lincoln	United States	Pinnacle Bank Arena	YG; DRAM	11,140 / 11,554	$677,964
August 19, 2017	Saint Paul	United States	Xcel Energy Center	YG; DRAM	14,458 / 14,614	$1,079,941
August 20, 2017	Chicago	United States	United Center	YG; DRAM		
August 22, 2017	Columbus	United States	Schottenstein Center	YG; DRAM	11,423 / 11,733	$802,906
August 23, 2017	Toronto	Canada	Air Canada Centre	YG; DRAM		
August 24, 2017	Montreal	Canada	Bell Centre	YG; DRAM	10,769 / 13,132	$930,271
August 25, 2017	Newark	United States	Prudential Center	YG; DRAM	10,314 / 10,976	$887,745
August 26, 2017 (Note: This concert was a part of the Hellow Festival.)	Monterrey	Mexico	Parque Fundidora	—N/a	—N/a	—N/a
August 29, 2017	Charlotte	United States	Spectrum Center	YG; DRAM	10,591 / 11,082	$686,960
August 30, 2017	Nashville	United States	Bridgestone Arena	YG; DRAM	15,206 / 15,206	$949,292
September 1, 2017	Tampa	United States	Amalie Arena	YG; DRAM	12,103 / 12,353	$834,155
September 2, 2017	Miami	United States	American Airlines Arena	YG; DRAM	12,256 / 12,718	$1,140,921
Leg 2 — Europe
February 7, 2018	Dublin	Ireland	3Arena	James Blake	12,644 / 12,644	$1,194,783
February 9, 2018	Birmingham	England	Genting Arena	James Blake	12,581 / 12,581	$1,229,103
February 10, 2018	Manchester	England	Manchester Arena	James Blake	14,485 / 14,485	$1,408,370
February 11, 2018	Glasgow	Scotland	SSE Hydro	James Blake	11,854 / 11,854	$1,089,330
February 12, 2018	London	England	The O_{2} Arena	James Blake	34,877 / 34,877	$3,284,010
February 13, 2018	London	England	The O_{2} Arena	James Blake	34,877 / 34,877	$3,284,010
February 15, 2018	Frankfurt	Germany	Festhalle	James Blake	11,089 / 11,089	$867,594
February 20, 2018	London	England	Wembley Arena	James Blake	10,049 / 10,049	$996,903
February 22, 2018	Cologne	Germany	Lanxess Arena	James Blake	12,593 / 12,593	$949,786
February 23, 2018	Amsterdam	Netherlands	Ziggo Dome	James Blake	16,220 / 16,220	$1,108,958
February 25, 2018	Paris	France	AccorHotels Arena	James Blake	30,970 / 30,970	$3,018,963
February 26, 2018	Paris	France	AccorHotels Arena	James Blake	30,970 / 30,970	$3,018,963
February 27, 2018	Antwerp	Belgium	Sportpaleis	James Blake	19,424 / 19,424	$1,403,113
March 1, 2018	Copenhagen	Denmark	Royal Arena	James Blake	15,187 / 15,187	$1,470,874
March 2, 2018	Oslo	Norway	Telenor Arena	James Blake	21,653 / 21,653	$1,786,295
March 3, 2018	Stockholm	Sweden	Ericsson Globe	James Blake	14,064 / 14,064	$1,290,910
March 5, 2018	Berlin	Germany	Mercedes-Benz Arena	James Blake	13,977 / 13,977	$1,093,940
Leg 3 — Oceania
July 10, 2018	Perth	Australia	Perth Arena	SiR	13,988 / 13,988	$1,588,770
July 13, 2018	Melbourne	Australia	Rod Laver Arena	SiR	25,479 / 25,479	$2,773,000
July 14, 2018	Melbourne	Australia	Rod Laver Arena	SiR	25,479 / 25,479	$2,773,000
July 15, 2018	Adelaide	Australia	Entertainment Centre Arena	SiR	—	—
July 17, 2018	Dunedin	New Zealand	Forsyth Barr Stadium	SiR	—	—
July 19, 2018	Auckland	New Zealand	Spark Arena	SiR	21,803 / 21,803	$1,311,371
July 20, 2018	Auckland	New Zealand	Spark Arena	SiR	21,803 / 21,803	$1,311,371
July 22, 2018 (Note: This concert was a part of the Splendour in the Grass Festival.)	Yelgun	Australia	North Byron Parklands	—N/a	—N/a	—N/a
July 24, 2018	Sydney	Australia	Qudos Bank Arena	SiR	29,712 / 29,712	$3,455,799
July 25, 2018	Sydney	Australia	Qudos Bank Arena	SiR	29,712 / 29,712	$3,455,799
Leg 4 — Asia
July 28, 2018 (Note: This concert was a part of the Fuji Rock Festival.)	Yuzawa	Japan	Naeba Ski Resort	—N/a	—N/a	—N/a
July 30, 2018	Seoul	South Korea	Jamsil Auxiliary Stadium	SiR	—	
Total					803,547	$68,824,717
