= Element (song) =

Song by Kendrick Lamar

from the album Damn
- Released: April 14, 2017
- Recorded: 2017
- Studio: Jungle City Studios
- Genre: Gangsta rap; trap; West Coast hip hop
- Length: 3:28
- Label: Top Dawg; Aftermath; Interscope
- Songwriters: Kendrick Duckworth; Mark Spears; James Blake; Ricci Riera; (add.); Bēkon (add.)
- Producers: Sounwave; Blake; Riera

Music video
- "Element" on YouTube

"Element" (stylized as "ELEMENT.") is a song by American rapper Kendrick Lamar, from his fourth studio album Damn, released on April 14, 2017. The fourth track on the album (eleventh on the Collector's Edition of Damn), the song was written by Lamar, Sounwave, James Blake, and Ricci Riera and produced by Sounwave, Blake, and Riera, with additional production by Tae Beast and Bēkon. The song charted in multiple countries in 2017.

== Background ==
The song was first introduced by basketball player LeBron James on his Instagram story when he filmed himself dancing to the song prior to Damn's release. In an interview with Big Boy, Lamar stated that Damn was his favorite album he ever created.

== Lyrics ==
The track opens with a skit from Kid Capri, who refers to Lamar as "Kung Fu Kenny". Afterwards Kendrick Lamar repeats the phrase "I don't give a fuck", before the first verse starts. This was interpreted by many sources as Lamar mocking Big Sean for his song "I Don't Fuck with You" in which he says the lyrics in a similar cadence.

Some sources have interpreted the song as a diss track on American rapper Big Sean and Canadian rapper Drake. However, Andres Tardio of Rap-Up has stated the song's hook as a possible diss on Drake, Big Sean, or American recording artist Jay Electronica.

The second verse of the song has been described to have a resemblance to Lamar's "The Heart Part 4", a song also theorized to have contained lyrics that diss Drake and Big Sean. The second verse as follows:

None of y’all fuckin’ with the flow, yeah, the flow, yeah
Years in the making, don’t y'all mistake it
I got ’em by a landslide, we talkin’ ’bout races
You know this’ll never be a tie, just look at they laces

== Production ==
The song features production from musician and producer James Blake. Ricci Riera, who previously worked as a producer on the Lamar-Schoolboy Q collaboration "Collard Greens", also worked as producer for the song. The song contains a sample of "Ha" by rapper Juvenile from his third studio album 400 Degreez.

== Music video ==
The song's accompanying music video premiered on June 27, 2017, on Lamar's Vevo channel on YouTube. The video was directed by Jonas Lindstroem and The Little Homies (the latter a pseudonym for Lamar himself and Dave Free).

Described as violent and powerful, the music video contains powerful imagery, some of which contains direct references to photographs of civil rights photographer, musician, writer, and director Gordon Parks. The video also mimics the imagery from the music video for "Humble", the first single from Damn.

The music video has received positive reviews. Lawrence Burney of noisey called the video "the masterpiece you anticipated."

== Critical reception ==
The song received highly positive reviews from critics. Joe Price of Pigeons and Planes named "Element" as one of the best songs of the week, the week of April 14, 2017, saying the song has "memorable verses and a sticky hook over some sparse but gorgeous production." Continuing, Price says "Element" is "a prime example of what makes Damn an immediately appealing body of work that is just as rewarding as his more challenging output." Meave McDermott of USA Today, in a positive review, said the song "still sounds sharp and unforgiving even when he's coining catchphrases."

== Live performances ==
Lamar performed "Element" for the first time live at the Coachella Valley Music and Arts Festival on April 23, 2017. His performance at Coachella was highly acclaimed, with the L.A. Times describing his performance as "simple, yet powerful."

Lamar has performed "Element" on The Damn tour and the Grand National Tour.

== Credits and personnel ==
Credits adapted from the official Damn digital booklet.

- Kendrick Lamar – songwriter
- Mark Spears – songwriter, producer
- James Blake – songwriter, producer
- Ricci Riera – songwriter, producer
- Tae Beast – additional production
- Bēkon – additional production
- Kid Capri – additional vocals
- Matt Schaeffer – mixing
- James Hunt – mixing
- Derek Ali – mixing
- Tyler Page – mix assistant
- Cyrus Taghipour – mix assistant
- Zeke Mishanec – additional recording
- Brendan Silas Perry – additional recording

== Charts ==
=== Weekly charts ===
Chart (2017)	Peak position
Austria (Ö3 Austria Top 40)	51
Canada Hot 100 (Billboard)	16
Czech Republic Singles Digital (ČNS IFPI)	60
France (SNEP)	69
Germany (GfK)	67
Ireland (IRMA)	17
Netherlands (Single Top 100)	44
New Zealand (Recorded Music NZ)	23
Portugal (AFP)	17
Slovakia Singles Digital (ČNS IFPI)	32
Sweden (Sverigetopplistan)	50
UK Singles (Official Charts)	33
US Billboard Hot 100	16
US Hot R&B/Hip-Hop Songs (Billboard)	9

=== Year-end charts ===
Chart (2017)	Position
US Hot R&B/Hip-Hop Songs (Billboard)	76

== Certifications ==
Region	Certification	Certified units/sales
Australia (ARIA)	2× Platinum	140,000^{‡}
Brazil (Pro-Música Brasil)	Gold	30,000^{‡}
Canada (Music Canada)	2× Platinum	160,000^{‡}
Denmark (IFPI Danmark)	Gold	45,000^{‡}
New Zealand (RMNZ)	Platinum	30,000^{‡}
United Kingdom (BPI)	Gold	400,000^{‡}
United States (RIAA)	Platinum	1,000,000^{‡}
^{‡} Sales+streaming figures based on certification alone.
