= Yah (song) =

Song by Kendrick Lamar

from the album Damn
- Released: April 14, 2017
- Recorded: 2017
- Studio: Jungle City
- Genre: Alternative hip-hop; trip hop
- Length: 2:40
- Label: Top Dawg; Aftermath; Interscope
- Songwriters: Kendrick Duckworth; Mark Spears; Dacoury Natche; Anthony Tiffith
- Producers: Sounwave; DJ Dahi; Tiffith; Bēkon (add.)

"Yah" (stylized as "YAH.") is a song by American rapper Kendrick Lamar, from his fourth studio album Damn, released on April 14, 2017. The third track on the album (twelfth on the Collector's Edition of Damn), the song was written by Lamar, Mark Spears, a.k.a. Sounwave, DJ Dahi, and Anthony Tiffith, and produced by, Sounwave, DJ Dahi, and Tiffith, with additional production by Bēkon. The song contains a reverse sample of "How Good Is Your Game" by American singer Billy Paul.

The song's title refers to "Yahweh", a romanization of the name of the Abrahamic God in the Hebrew Bible (יהוה).

== Lyrics ==
The song shows Lamar expressing his inner thoughts, a subject he rarely touches upon in interviews.

In the lyrics, Lamar calls out Fox News' reporter Geraldo Rivera, who criticized Lamar's performance of "Alright" at the BET Awards 2015.

The song makes multiple references to religion, a theme Lamar would reference multiple times throughout Damn. Lamar specifically references the Book of Deuteronomy, the fifth book from the Hebrew Bible and the Christian Old Testament. Lamar mentions his cousin, Carl Duckworth, who teaches Lamar about the Book of Deuteronomy and how the book talks about penalties for breaking the rule of God. A voicemail snippet from Carl appears in the song "Fear", also from Damn, during which he espouses the beliefs of the Hebrew Israelite group where he is a member. At one point, Lamar raps "I'm a Israelite, don't call me black no mo'," which is a clear reference to Black Israelism.

According to Spin magazine, the song drew influence from American rapper Kanye West's song "Jesus Walks" from his first studio album The College Dropout, a song that also drew biblical allusions.

== Credits and personnel ==
Credits adapted from the official Damn digital booklet.

- Kendrick Lamar – songwriter
- Mark Spears – songwriter, producer
- Dacoury Natche – songwriter, producer
- Anthony Tiffith – songwriter, producer
- Bēkon – additional production, additional vocals
- Derek Ali – mixing
- Tyler Page – mix assistant
- Cyrus Taghipour – mix assistant
- Geraldo Rivera – additional vocals

== Charts ==
Chart (2017)	Peak position
Austria (Ö3 Austria Top 40)	67
Canada Hot 100 (Billboard)	27
Czech Republic Singles Digital (ČNS IFPI)	79
France (SNEP)	96
Germany (GfK)	100
Ireland (IRMA)	29
Netherlands (Single Top 100)	100
New Zealand (Recorded Music NZ)	30
Portugal (AFP)	24
Slovakia Singles Digital (ČNS IFPI)	39
Sweden (Sverigetopplistan)	69
UK Singles (Official Charts)	45
US Billboard Hot 100	32
US Hot R&B/Hip-Hop Songs (Billboard)	18

== Certifications ==
Region	Certification	Certified units/sales
Australia (ARIA)	Gold	35,000^{‡}
Canada (Music Canada)	Platinum	80,000^{‡}
New Zealand (RMNZ)	Gold	15,000^{‡}
United States (RIAA)	Gold	500,000^{‡}
^{‡} Sales+streaming figures based on certification alone.
