= Feel (Kendrick Lamar song) =

Song by Kendrick Lamar

from the album Damn
- Recorded: 2017
- Genre: Jazz rap
- Length: 3:35
- Label: Top Dawg; Aftermath; Interscope
- Songwriters: Kendrick Duckworth; Mark Spears
- Producer: Sounwave

"Feel" (stylized as "FEEL.") is a song by American rapper Kendrick Lamar, from his fourth studio album Damn, released on April 14, 2017. The fifth track on the album (tenth on the Collector's Edition of Damn), the song was written by Lamar and Mark Spears, a.k.a. Sounwave, and produced by Sounwave. The song features bass from bass guitarist Thundercat and vocals from Chelsea Blythe. The song originally had a music video which was not released, but leaked on YouTube.

== Lyrics ==
The song sees Lamar taking a deeper look into the void and isolation caused by fame and success, specifically how he feels detached from his family and friends.

A common recurrence in "Feel" is the phrase "Ain't nobody prayin' for me", a sentiment that Lamar "revisits elsewhere".

== Critical reception ==
In a positive review, writers of Rolling Stone magazine said "with round, textured notes from the Grammy-winning bass virtuoso Thundercat and a rickety, rim-shot drum pulse, "Feel" nods to the live-musician inflections of To Pimp a Butterfly – or the sixth track from last year's untitled unmastered. Ann Powers of NPR Music also gave a positive review, saying "Feel" was the first song that "jumped out" at her on Damn. Powers also commented that the song is reminiscent of To Pimp a Butterfly.

== Samples ==
The song contains a sample of the song "Stormy" by American musician O. C. Smith from the album For Once in My Life. It also contains interpolations from "Don't Let Me Down" by Fleurie from the album Love and War.

== Live performances ==
Lamar has performed "Feel" as an encore on the Damn tour.

== Credits and personnel ==
Credits adapted from the official Damn digital booklet.

- Kendrick Lamar – songwriter
- Mark Spears – songwriter, producer, mixing
- Thundercat – bass
- Chelsea Blythe – additional vocals
- Matt Schaeffer – additional guitar, mixing
- Derek Ali – mixing
- Tyler Page – mix assistant
- Cyrus Taghipour – mix assistant

== Charts ==
Chart (2017)	Peak position
Austria (Ö3 Austria Top 40)	66
Canada Hot 100 (Billboard)	30
Czech Republic Singles Digital (ČNS IFPI)	80
France (SNEP)	105
Germany (GfK)	82
Ireland (IRMA)	34
Netherlands (Single Top 100)	56
New Zealand (Recorded Music NZ)	32
Portugal (AFP)	28
Slovakia Singles Digital (ČNS IFPI)	41
Sweden (Sverigetopplistan)	51
UK Singles (Official Charts)	46
US Billboard Hot 100	35
US Hot R&B/Hip-Hop Songs (Billboard)	21

== Certifications ==
Region	Certification	Certified units/sales
Australia (ARIA)	Gold	35,000^{‡}
Canada (Music Canada)	Platinum	80,000^{‡}
New Zealand (RMNZ)	Gold	15,000^{‡}
United Kingdom (BPI)	Silver	200,000^{‡}
United States (RIAA)	Gold	500,000^{‡}
^{‡} Sales+streaming figures based on certification alone.
