= 24K Magic (song) =

2016 single by Bruno Mars

- R3hab remix cover art

Single by Bruno Mars

from the album 24K Magic
- Released: October 7, 2016
- Recorded: 2015–16
- Studio: Glenwood Place (Burbank, California)
- Genre: Funk; disco; R&B
- Length: 3:45
- Label: Atlantic
- Songwriters: Bruno Mars; Philip Lawrence; Christopher Brody Brown
- Producers: Shampoo Press & Curl; The Stereotypes (add.)

Bruno Mars singles chronology
"Uptown Funk" (2014)	"24K Magic" (2016)	"That's What I Like" (2017)

Music video
- "24K Magic" on YouTube

"24K Magic" is a song by the American singer-songwriter Bruno Mars from his third album 24K Magic (2016). Atlantic Records released it as the album's lead single on October 7, 2016, for digital download and streaming. It was provided as an instant grat track for those who pre-ordered the album. Mars, Philip Lawrence and Christopher Brody Brown wrote the single. Calling themselves Shampoo Press & Curl, the three handled production, with additional production by the Stereotypes. The song has been described as a funk, disco and contemporary R&B track. The song's lyrics address extravagance, glamour, and the party lifestyle.

"24K Magic" was generally well received by music critics. Some of them complimented Mars' vocals and compared them to James Brown, describing the song as engaging, fun, and evoking feelings of nostalgia. Others criticized it for not being innovative as it tried to emulate "Uptown Funk" (2014). The song was a commercial success. It peaked at number four in the United States and number three in Canada and Australia. It has been certified five times platinum by the Recording Industry Association of America (RIAA), the Australian Recording Industry Association (ARIA) and Recorded Music NZ (RMNZ). The single reached number one in New Zealand, France, Belgium (Flanders) and Argentina. It has received a diamond certification in France Syndicat national de l'édition phonographique (SNEP) and diamond by Music Canada (MC). In the United Kingdom and Spain, the song peaked at number five, being certified three times platinum by the British Phonographic Industry (BPI).

Director Cameron Duddy shot the song's music video with Mars. It depicts Mars and his bandmates partying and having fun in a Las Vegas casino. At the end of the video, Mars is riding a jet ski in the Fountains of the Bellagio Hotel. He performed "24K Magic" on television shows such as Saturday Night Live and The Late Late Show. It was first included on his 24K Magic World Tour (2017–18) and his Bruno Mars Live promotional tour (2022–24). The song received several nominations and won Record of the Year at the 60th Annual Grammy Awards in 2018. Kendrick Lamar's single "Loyalty" (2017) featuring Rihanna sampled the song's introduction.

== Background and development ==
In September 2014, Bruno Mars tweeted "Now it's time to start writing chapter 3", hinting he was working on new music. Following the release of the successful Mark Ronson and Mars single "Uptown Funk" (2014), the latter headed to the studio to record more songs. Mars said he had no plans to release a new album "[u]ntil it's done". It was due in March, but his appearance at the Super Bowl halftime show postponed it for several months. At the time, seven songs were already recorded. On October 3, 2016, Mars revealed the song title and release date through his Instagram account after he uploaded nine photos. They showed the singer looking down wearing a white hat with "XXIV k" inscribed on it. Mars wrote, "You can call it my first single, but I call it the invitation to the party".

The Stereotypes had known Mars and worked with him since 2007; however, after the singer signed a deal with Atlantic Records, they did not collaborate very often. Nevertheless, in 2015 Jonathan Yip talked with Mars about working together. Since the singer was already recording 24K Magic, Mars asked for "some beats" and Yip sent them. Later, he asked for more beats and the Stereotypes sent them, but they never heard from him and "nothing came of it". In June 2016, Yip touched base with Mars. He asked Yip if they would like to help him finish a song for his album, to add a little "seasoning". He needed another song with a certain tempo and key. Yip sent Mars an idea that caught his attention, and he asked the Stereotypes to come to the studio.

Once in the studio, it took them some time to "get the groove" on the track. They spent the first couple of hours catching up and having fun. When they began working, Ray Charles McCullough II was "getting scared". He felt this was a "make-or-break moment"—they needed to help Mars with the song. Ray Romulus recalled the singer telling them he wanted to create something that would make people dance again, because in clubs the crowd is on their phones, not moving and glancing at each other. At this point, Mars showed them a "rough idea" of the song. The Stereotypes started programming the drums for "24K Magic" and finished it in a day. It was the first track the team recorded for the album. Brody Brown affirmed: "On the song "24K Magic", we tried it many times until we found that gold."

In an interview with NME, Mars said he wrote "24K Magic" when "Uptown Funk" (2014) was "number one", so the songs share the same "spirit". In another interview with Zane Lowe for Beats 1, Mars explained that the album was going to be a movie and the lead single was its opening. He wanted the song "to get the party started". To achieve that, it needed to sound genuine and that he was having a good time, so he used his emotions and feelings to guide him. He also admitted that "24K Magic' was influenced by West Coast hip hop artists like "Dr. Dre, DJ Quik, Suga Free ... [they represented] a time when it was okay to party, to be flashy, to get on the dance floor". In November 2017, Mars was a guest on the Charlie Rose Show and shared that the song was the vision he had intended for the album: "I saw us having fun on stage. I saw us draped in silk and gold and me and my friends going up on stage and having the best time. It was important that we had the content to do so".

== Production and release ==
Mars, Philip Lawrence and Christopher Brody Brown wrote "24K Magic". They handled the production under the name Shampoo Press & Curl with additional production by the Stereotypes. Mars, Lawrence, Brown and James Fauntleroy provided the background vocals. Dave Foreman played the guitar, while Byron "Mr. Talkbox" Chambers and Mars provided the vocals on the talk box. Charles Moniz, with engineering assistant Jacob Dennis, engineered and recorded the song at Glenwood Place Studios in Burbank. Serban Ghenea mixed "24K Magic" at MixStar Studios in Virginia Beach, with John Hanes serving as the mix engineer. It was mastered by Tom Coyne at Sterling Sound, NYC.

"24K Magic" premiered on October 7, 2016 at midnight on radio station WBMX. Atlantic Records released the single the same day for digital download and streaming. The album was made available for pre-order worldwide via Mars's official site, with the song as an instant download. Warner Music Group also issued the track for radio airplay in Italy on the same date. BBC Radio 1 began adding the song onto their playlists on October 8, 2016. Subsequently, the song was released to US contemporary hit radio stations on October 11, 2016. On May 26, 2017, Atlantic Records made a remix version by Dutch DJ R3hab available for digital download and streaming.

== Composition ==
"24K Magic"
A 20-second sample of "24K Magic" chorus' about jewelry and the party lifestyle over a funk-disco beat.

"24K Magic" is a funk, disco, and R&B song, heavily influenced by hip hop. It is composed in the key of F minor at a tempo of 94 beats per minute. The song begins with a talk box intro, performed by Byron "Mr. Talk Box" Chambers and Mars. Initially, reviewers thought the vocals on the intro had Auto-Tune, a vocoder or synthetic vocals. Eventually, they concluded that it was a talk box, developed by Roger Troutman and Zapp, which heavily influenced the single. Forbes and Entertainment Weekly's music critics noticed the resemblance between the "robotic-sound" intro on "24K Magic" and Tupac Shakur's "California Love" (1995). The song features several layers of funk synthesizers in its instrumentation, which drew comparisons to Prince. It also features bass lines similar to The Gap Band's style. Its structure borrows from "Uptown Funk" as Mars raps while singing the track with a "call and response" composition. The bridge features a record scratching, while the backing vocals of Mars, Lawrence, Brown and Fauntleroy make heavy use of a vocoder. The synthesizer riff and backbeat of "24K Magic" has been interpreted by The A.V. Club as having a resemblance to the one in "The Message" (1982) by Grandmaster Flash and the Furious Five. Critics found the sound to be closer to that of 1980s electronica, hip hop and R&B than the 1970s style of "Uptown Funk".

The track reaches its "ebullient" and "infectious" chorus where Mars sings, "Put your pinky rings up to the moon/What y'all tryna do?/24K magic in the air". All the verses are designed with a "call-and-response hook". In the opening lyrics, Mars shouts, "Guess who's back again!/Oh, they don't know? I bet they know as soon as we walk in". Punctuating the verses, he continues with more confidence, "I'm a dangerous man with some money in my pocket", while backed up by a chorus "adding tough-guy punch to his mellifluous" shouts. The exhortations and confidence in his vocals reminded critics of James Brown. The lyrics celebrate extravagances, glamour and the party lifestyle. Many reviewers felt "24K Magic" condensed a playlist's worth of '80s electro-R&B into one song, with a modern twist on its lyrics.

== Critical reception ==
"24K Magic" has received generally positive reviews from music critics. Entertainment Weekly's Eric Renner Brown gave "24K Magic" an "A" note. He praised the lead single, saying it is on the same level as Mars's earlier "Just the Way You Are" (2010) and "Locked Out of Heaven" (2012), and maybe even better due to its "detail and finesse". According to Brown, these qualities along with "world-class vocals" allow "24K Magic" to "levitate". He felt Tupac Shakur's "California Love" (1995) and Michael Jackson's Off the Wall (1979) influenced it. Jay Willis of GQ called the song "delightful"— the second part of "Uptown Funk". Willis praised Mars for using the same formula as the earlier single and described the intro as "reminiscent of mid-1990s K-Ci & Jojo". Carl Williott of Idolator rated the song a nine out of ten, comparing it to "Pure Funk compilations, West Coast G-funk and to Midnight Star". Williott said the track did not bring anything new, but it came at a time when there were not enough party songs. In the same review, Mike Wass awarded the song 8 out of 10, feeling that it is a mashup of '70s, '80s and '90s R&B into "a nuclear-power party anthem" to be played in discos over the next years. Time's Tekendra Parmar called the title track "delicious". The staff of Rap-Up thought Mars created a great song, calling the hook "infectious". Jason Lipshutz of Billboard compared "24K Magic" to the TV show Stranger Things (2016), since both evoke nostalgic feelings. Lipshutz found the single "impressive", with a "killer groove" that mashed the "G-funk" genre into a song with modern elements. He also complimented Mars's vocals and "ear for melody". Patrick Bowen, reviewing the album for Idolator, said "24K Magic" has the best chorus Mars ever wrote, being superior to "Uptown Funk" in every detail.

In a mixed review for Idolator, Rachel Sonis gave "24K Magic" a 6.5 out of 10. She described the track as "glossy, lavish and teeming with old-school The Neptunes vibes", but concluded it does not accomplish anything new. Robbie Daw of the site rated the track 5 out of 10 saying that it is a throwback to the '80s R&B as a continuation of "Uptown Funk". He too thought it did not add anything new—"it simply keeps the party going".

=== Accolades ===
The song was listed by several publications as being among the best songs of the year. Entertainment Weekly's Ray Rahman dubbed the song a "bulletproof party jam", ranking it number 35 on the list of 100 songs. On the list of the 101 best songs of 2016 compiled by Spin, the publication ranked the song at number 61 and Winston Cook-Wilson said that Mars emulated the style he listened to while growing up and was nothing but impressive. On the Billboard 100 Best Pop Songs of 2016: Critics' Picks list, the single was placed at number 64. Taylor Weatherby wrote that Mars was able to "create another bonafide hip-shaker" like "Uptown Funk" thanks to "24K Magic"'s "infectious beat and James Brown-worthy vocal exhortations". The Village Voice's annual year-end Pazz & Jop critics' poll selected it as the 48th best song of 2016, tied with Childish Gambino's "Redbone" and Beyoncé's "All Night". In 2017, "24K Magic" received a nomination for International Hit of the Year at the 2017 Danish GAFFA Awards. It was nominated by the 48th NAACP Image Awards for Outstanding Song, Contemporary. In the same year, "24K Magic" won Top 40 Single of the Year at the New Music Awards.

In the same year, at the 30th Annual Nickelodeon Kids' Choice Awards, the track received a nomination for Favorite Song, and a nomination for International Hit of the Year at the MTV Millennial Awards. At the 2017 Radio Disney Music Awards, the single won the award for Best Song That Makes You Smile. "24K Magic" received the accolade for Top 10 Gold International Gold Songs at the RTHK International Pop Poll. In the same year, it was nominated for Best R&B Song at the 2017 Billboard Music Awards. The song was nominated for Choice Music: Pop Song at the 2017 Teen Choice Awards, but lost. In 2018, "24K Magic" won Record of The Year at the 60th Annual Grammy Awards ceremony. That same year, it lost the award for International Work of the Year at the APRA Music Awards. The song won an award for excellence in Record Production/Single or Track at the 2018 TEC Awards. Mediabase, in their year-end list of 2017, had "24K Magic" as the third most-played song at Urban AC stations. In 2017 and 2018, the track was one of the winners of Most Performed Songs at the ASCAP Pop Music Awards. In 2018, it was one of the winners of R&B/Hip-Hop Songs at the Rhythm & Soul Music Awards.

== Commercial performance ==
In the United States, "24K Magic" debuted at number five on the Billboard Hot 100 with 101,000 downloads, 12.8 million streams and 65 million radio impressions in its first full tracking week. At the time, it was Mars's highest debut on the Hot 100 chart. On the week of December 10, 2016, the single reached its peak of number four on the Billboard Hot 100. "24K Magic" became Mars's seventh number-one song on the Billboard Rhythmic chart, and peaked at number two on the Dance Club Songs and Dance/Mix Show Airplay charts. It peaked at number three on the Billboard Adult Pop Songs and Hot R&B/Hip-Hop Songs charts. "24K Magic" peaked at number three on the Canadian Hot 100 for the week of December 31, 2016. The Recording Industry Association of America (RIAA) certified it five times platinum, while Music Canada (MC) certified it diamond. As of September 2017, the single has sold 1,722,000 pure copies in the US.

"24K Magic" debuted at number one on France's music chart for the week ending October 15, 2016. It was certified diamond by the Syndicat National de l'Édition Phonographique (SNEP). In Belgium, it reached the top spot on the Ultratop 50 in Flanders and earned a platinum certification. In its third week on the Argentinian Monitor Latino chart, the track reached the top spot. The song entered at number 13 on the New Zealand Singles Chart and peaked at number one, spending two weeks in the top spot. It received a six-time platinum certification by Recorded Music New Zealand (RMNZ). In Australia, "24K Magic" debuted at number 12 on the ARIA Singles Chart, and ultimately peaked at number three. The song has been certified five times platinum by the Australian Recording Industry Association (ARIA), with 350,000 certified units. The single peaked at number four on the Portuguese Singles Chart after debuting at number 20.

In the United Kingdom, the song debuted at number nine on the UK Singles Chart on October 20, 2016. It peaked at number five on the week of November 17, 2016. The British Phonographic Industry (BPI) certified "24K Magic" three times platinum for over 1,800,000 certified units. On the Scottish Singles Chart, it also peaked within the top five. In the Republic of Ireland, the single peaked at number ten on the Irish Singles Chart, after debuting at number 25. The song reached the top five of the Spanish Top 100 and later received a double platinum certification by Productores de Música de España (PROMUSICAE), and peaked at number six in the Dutch Top 40. In Switzerland, it entered the top ten by peaking at number nine on the Singles Top 75 and received a gold certification by IFPI Switzerland. In Italy, the song was certified two times platinum, despite only peaking at number 16 on the FIMI Singles Chart. The track peaked at number two on the South Korea International Chart, number three and four on the Lebanese Top 20 and Brasil Hot 100 Airplay. It also peaked at number two on the Hungarian Rádiós Top 40 and at number nine on the Philippine Hot 100.

== Music videos ==
=== Development and synopsis ===
The song's official music video was filmed in Las Vegas, Nevada. Some of the filming locations included the Fountains of the Bellagio hotel and the Fremont Hotel and Casino. Mars and his frequent collaborator Cameron Duddy directed the video released on October 7, 2016. It begins with Mars's private jet landing at the McCarran International Airport in Las Vegas. Surrounded by luxurious cars, the jet's steps are lowered. Then, Mars is seen wearing Versace, designer minks and a baseball cap with XXIV written on it as he starts to put on his golden jewelry that consists of rings, chain necklaces, and sunglasses. His band, The Hooligans, feature in the music video wearing lightweight tracksuits. The rest of the video includes intercut shots of Mars and his band having fun by the poolside, partying, drinking, and playing the tables at the MGM Grand Las Vegas. They party and dance with glasses of champagne in their hands, inside and at the front of casinos. The video features several women wearing "door knocker earrings" in bikinis and sometimes wearing men's denim, while they twerk. Other scenes include the singer and some of his bandmates driving down the Strip in a black Cadillac Allanté convertible, later purchased by Mars, and riding power-driven scooters in the casino, while "throwing money in the air". At the end of the video, Mars rides a jet ski in the Fountains of the Bellagio hotel.

A second promotional music video, with Victoria's Secret Angels, was released on December 2, 2016. It features Victoria's Secret models Adriana Lima, Elsa Hosk, Jasmine Tookes, Lais Ribeiro, Romee Strijd, Stella Maxwell and Taylor Hill lip-syncing to the song. It has been described as the fusion of a "homemade music video and a Victoria's Secret ad".

=== Reception ===
Raquel Rose Burger of Billboard noticed the 1990s hip-hop trends included in the music video, including the likes of tracksuits, gold chains and snapbacks, among others. Partick Bowen from Idolator found the music video "approximately 95% stunting". NME's Rhian Daly criticized the video clip not only for its lack of originality but also the number of clichés. Daly pointed out how Mars could not stop showing off how rich he is. Tom Breihan of Stereogum considered the second promotional music video average with nothing "especially fun or spontaneous about it". However, he felt "it does have a lot of very beautiful women in it". Jordan Appugliesi from Entertainment Tonight Canada thought the girls in the video looked "adorable" and they were having a blast "in the super fun video" while looking amazing.

The official video received multiple awards and nominations. In 2017, it received an award for Video of the Year and a nomination for Coca-Cola Viewers' Choice at the BET Awards. At the 2017 MTV Video Music Awards, it received nominations for Video of the Year, Best Direction and Best Art Direction. That same year, the video received a nomination for Outstanding Music Video at the 48th NAACP Image Awards. It was also nominated for Favorite Music Video at the 2017 Nickelodeon Kids' Choice Awards. At the 2017 Soul Train Music Awards, the music video won Mars Best Dance Performance and Video of the Year. As of August 2025, the video has received over 1.7 billion views on YouTube.

== Live performances ==
Mars first performed the song live on Saturday Night Live on October 15, 2016. His performance was well received by critics. Daniel Kreps of Rolling Stone magazine praised the "electric performance" describing it as a "fluid, full-scale spectacle as the camera followed Mars and his singers down a hallway and into the audience" throwing an "epic dance party". Christina Lee of Idolator praised the performance, writing that it was a party with a "California Love" vibe for the "Nae Nae generation". She added that Mars and his band came from backstage, "West Side Story-style, to join a crowd that was already dancing". He also performed "24K Magic" live on The X Factor UK on October 30, 2016. The Daily Express's Becca Longmire found the performance "epic". It caused some controversy as he and his band were accused of "miming". The singer was "insulted" by the accusations and denied them. Mars performed the song with his band on BBC Radio's 1 Live Lounge on November 4, 2016.

The singer performed "24K Magic" on November 6, 2016 at the MTV Europe Music Awards. Adelle Platon of Billboard praised his show, saying it was "an illuminated performance" thanks to the pyro used. He was also complimented on his "disco moves ... synched with lights on the stage floor". Later that month, he performed the single on the Norwegian television talk show Skavlan and on the following day at the 2016 NRJ Music Awards. Mars also performed the single at the 2016 American Music Awards on November 20, 2016. His band joined him on the stage, which featured an electric blue background and pyro. The performance included a break dance. On November 30, 2016, the singer performed it at the Victoria's Secret Fashion Show 2016, aired on CBS. His performance was part of the "Bright Night Angel" segment. During The Late Late Show with James Corden on December 13, 2016, Mars included "24K Magic" on the popular segment Carpool Karaoke. Mars also performed the single on top of the Apollo Theater marquee alongside the majority of the 24K Magic album for his CBS prime time special titled Bruno Mars: 24K Magic Live at the Apollo, which aired on November 29, 2017. The track was the second song on the set list of his third tour, 24K Magic World Tour (2017–18), and also as the second song of his concerts on his Bruno Mars Live promotional tour (2022–24).

== Use in other media ==
In 2017, Conor Maynard and Alex Aiono covered "24K Magic" in a sing-off. Kendrick Lamar's single "Loyalty" featuring Rihanna, from his album Damn (2017), sampled the song's intro reversed. In early 2017, Heidi Klum used the track in the trailer announcement for the next season of Germany's Next Topmodel, where she is one of the judges. "24K Magic" ended up being used on the 12th season of Germany's Next Topmodel. Hershey featured the song in a 2018 commercial for its Hershey's Gold chocolate bar. The track is featured in the video game Just Dance 2018 and in the film Hotel Transylvania 3: Summer Vacation.

== Formats and track listings ==
Digital download
No.	Title	Length
1.	"24K Magic"	3:46

Digital download
No.	Title	Length
1.	"24K Magic" (R3hab remix)	2:38

== Personnel ==
Credits adapted from the liner notes of 24K Magic.

- Bruno Mars – lead vocals, songwriting, background vocals, talkbox
- Philip Lawrence – songwriting, background vocals
- Christopher Brody Brown – songwriting, background vocals
- Shampoo Press & Curl – production
- The Stereotypes – additional production
- James Fauntleroy – background vocals
- Byron "Mr. Talkbox" Chambers – talkbox
- Dave Foreman – guitar
- Charles Moniz – recording, engineering
- Jacob Dennis – engineering assistance
- Serban Ghenea – mixing
- John Hanes – mix engineering
- Tom Coyne – mastering

== Charts ==
=== Weekly charts ===
List of chart performance
Chart (2016–2018)	Peak position
Argentina (Monitor Latino)	1
Australia (ARIA)	3
Austria (Ö3 Austria Top 40)	22
Belgium (Ultratop 50 Flanders)	1
Belgium (Ultratop 50 Wallonia)	3
Brazil (Top 100 Brasil)	53
Canada Hot 100 (Billboard)	3
Canada AC (Billboard)	1
Canada CHR/Top 40 (Billboard)	4
Canada Hot AC (Billboard)	1
Chile (Monitor Latino)	12
Czech Republic Airplay (ČNS IFPI)	22
Czech Republic Singles Digital (ČNS IFPI)	10
Denmark (Tracklisten)	18
Ecuador (National-Report)	6
Finland Download (Latauslista)	3
France (SNEP)	1
Germany (GfK)	14
Hungary (Dance Top 40)	2
Hungary (Rádiós Top 40)	2
Hungary (Single Top 40)	5
Hungary (Stream Top 40)	15
Ireland (IRMA)	10
Israel International Airplay (Media Forest)	1
Italy (FIMI)	16
Japan Hot 100 (Billboard)	16
Lebanon Airplay (Lebanese Top 20)	3
Luxembourg Digital Song Sales (Billboard)	7
Mexico (Billboard Mexican Airplay)	12
Netherlands (Dutch Top 40)	6
Netherlands (Single Top 100)	5
New Zealand (Recorded Music NZ)	1
Norway (VG-lista)	16
Panama (Monitor Latino)	11
Paraguay (Monitor Latino)	4
Philippines (Philippine Hot 100)	9
Poland Airplay (ZPAV)	40
Portugal (AFP)	4
Romania (Airplay 100)	31
Scottish Singles Sales (Official Charts)	5
Slovakia Airplay (ČNS IFPI)	35
Slovakia Singles Digital (ČNS IFPI)	7
Slovenia (SloTop50)	19
South Korea International (Gaon)	2
Spain (Promusicae)	5
Sweden (Sverigetopplistan)	22
Switzerland (Schweizer Hitparade)	9
UK Singles (Official Charts)	5
Uruguay (Monitor Latino)	9
US Billboard Hot 100	4
US Adult Contemporary (Billboard)	13
US Adult Pop Airplay (Billboard)	3
US Dance Club Songs (Billboard)	2
US Dance Airplay (Billboard)	2
US Hot R&B/Hip-Hop Songs (Billboard)	3
US Latin Airplay (Billboard)	36
US Pop Airplay (Billboard)	5
US Rhythmic Airplay (Billboard)	1
Venezuela (Record Report)	59

List of chart performance
Chart (2024)	Peak position
Singapore (RIAS)	15

List of chart performance
Chart (2026)	Peak position
Global 200 (Billboard)	191

=== Year-end charts ===
List of Year-end charts
Chart (2016)	Position
Argentina (Monitor Latino)	17
Australia (ARIA)	59
Belgium (Ultratop Flanders)	48
France (SNEP)	99
Hungary (Dance Top 40)	46
Hungary (Single Top 40)	54
Netherlands (Dutch Top 40)	47
UK Singles (OCC)	68

List of Year-end charts
Chart (2017)	Position
Argentina (Monitor Latino)	5
Australia (ARIA)	82
Belgium (Ultratop Flanders)	50
Belgium (Ultratop Wallonia)	51
Canada (Canadian Hot 100)	27
France (SNEP)	112
Hungary (Dance Top 40)	5
Hungary (Rádiós Top 40)	20
Hungary (Single Top 40)	65
Japan (Japan Hot 100)	38
Netherlands (Dutch Top 40)	78
Netherlands (Single Top 100)	98
Panama (Monitor Latino)	27
Spain (PROMUSICAE)	86
Switzerland (Schweizer Hitparade)	80
UK Singles (OCC)	95
US Billboard Hot 100	16
US Adult Contemporary (Billboard)	35
US Adult Top 40 (Billboard)	21
US Dance Club Songs (Billboard)	41
US Dance/Mix Show Airplay (Billboard)	35
US Hot R&B/Hip-Hop Songs (Billboard)	12
US Mainstream Top 40 (Billboard)	35
US Rhythmic (Billboard)	36

List of Year-end charts
Chart (2018)	Position
Argentina (Monitor Latino)	99
Hungary (Dance Top 40)	64

== Certifications ==
List of certifications
Region	Certification	Certified units/sales
Australia (ARIA)	5× Platinum	350,000^{‡}
Belgium (BRMA)	Platinum	20,000^{‡}
Canada (Music Canada)	Diamond	800,000^{‡}
Denmark (IFPI Danmark)	2× Platinum	180,000^{‡}
France (SNEP)	Diamond	233,333^{‡}
Germany (BVMI)	Platinum	400,000^{‡}
Italy (FIMI)	2× Platinum	100,000^{‡}
Japan (RIAJ)	Gold	100,000^{*}
New Zealand (RMNZ)	6× Platinum	180,000^{‡}
Poland (ZPAV)	Platinum	50,000^{‡}
Portugal (AFP)	Platinum	10,000^{‡}
Spain (Promusicae)	2× Platinum	80,000^{‡}
Sweden (GLF)	Platinum	40,000^{‡}
Switzerland (IFPI Switzerland)	Gold	15,000^{‡}
United Kingdom (BPI)	3× Platinum	1,800,000^{‡}
United States (RIAA)	5× Platinum	5,000,000^{‡}
Streaming
Japan (RIAJ)	Platinum	100,000,000^{†}
^{*} Sales figures based on certification alone.^{‡} Sales+streaming figures based on certification alone.^{†} Streaming-only figures based on certification alone.

== Release history ==
List of release history, showing region(s), date(s), format(s), version(s) and label(s)
Region	Date	Format	Version	Label	Ref.
Various	October 7, 2016	Digital download; streaming	Original	Atlantic	
Italy	October 7, 2016	Radio airplay	Original	Warner Music Group	
United States	October 11, 2016	Contemporary hit radio	Original	Atlantic	
Various	May 26, 2017	Digital download; streaming	R3hab remix	Atlantic	

== See also ==
- List of airplay number-one hits of the 2010s (Argentina)
- List of Billboard Hot 100 top 10 singles in 2016
- List of Billboard Rhythmic number-one songs of the 2010s
- List of number-one hits of 2016 (France)
- List of number-one singles from the 2010s (New Zealand)
- List of UK top-ten singles in 2016
- List of Ultratop 50 number-one singles of 2017
