= God (Kendrick Lamar song) =

Song by Kendrick Lamar

from the album Damn
- Released: April 14, 2017
- Recorded: 2017
- Genre: Hip-hop; R&B; trap
- Length: 4:08
- Label: Top Dawg; Aftermath; Interscope
- Songwriters: Kendrick Duckworth; Ricci Riera; Mark Spears; Dacoury Natche; Daniel Tannenbaum; Ronald LaTour; Anthony Tiffith; Daveon Jackson; Mike Hector; Travis Walton; Brock Korsan
- Producers: Riera; Sounwave; DJ Dahi; Bēkon; Cardo; Tiffith; Yung Exclusive; Hector; Walton

"God" (stylized as "GOD.") is a song by American rapper Kendrick Lamar, from his fourth studio album Damn, released on April 14, 2017. The thirteenth and penultimate track on the album (second on the Collector's Edition of Damn), the song was produced by Ricci Riera, Sounwave, DJ Dahi, Bēkon, Cardo, Tiffith, with additional production by Yung Exclusive, Mike Hector, and Teddy Walton.

The song details Lamar's successes, how it feels, and why he works so hard to get to where he is today. The song also finds Lamar declaring his faux-divinity as a rap god.

== Background ==
Before the release of Damn, the album itself was rumored to be centered around God. It was soon confirmed by Lamar himself. Lamar has been a devout Christian since approximately his late teen years or adolescence.

== Live performances ==
Lamar performed "God" live at the Coachella Valley Music and Arts Festival on April 23, 2017.

Lamar performed "God" at every show as an encore on The Damn Tour.

== Credits and personnel ==
Credits adapted from the official Damn digital booklet.

- Kendrick Lamar – songwriter
- Ricci Riera – songwriter, producer
- Mark Spears – songwriter, producer
- Dacoury Natche – songwriter, producer
- Daniel Tannenbaum – songwriter
- Bēkon – producer, additional vocals
- Ronald LaTour – songwriter, producer
- Anthony Tiffith – songwriter, producer
- Mike Hector – additional drums
- Derek Ali – mixing
- Tyler Page – mix assistant
- Cyrus Taghipour – mix assistant

== Charts ==
Chart (2017)	Peak position
Canada Hot 100 (Billboard)	50
France (SNEP)	192
Ireland (IRMA)	57
Portugal (AFP)	55
Slovakia Singles Digital (ČNS IFPI)	70
Sweden Heatseeker (Sverigetopplistan)	9
UK Singles (Official Charts)	81
US Billboard Hot 100	58
US Hot R&B/Hip-Hop Songs (Billboard)	33

== Certifications ==
Region	Certification	Certified units/sales
Australia (ARIA)	Gold	35,000^{‡}
Canada (Music Canada)	Gold	40,000^{‡}
New Zealand (RMNZ)	Gold	15,000^{‡}
United States (RIAA)	Gold	500,000^{‡}
^{‡} Sales+streaming figures based on certification alone.
