= Ricci Riera =

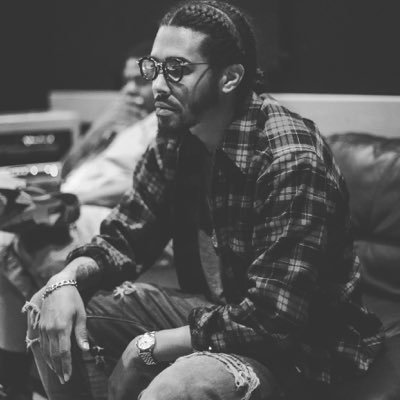

Background information
- Origin: Los Angeles, California, United States
- Genres: Hip hop
- Occupations: Record producer; disc jockey; songwriter
- Instrument: Logic Pro
- Years active: 2011–present

Ricci Riera, is an American record producer, DJ and songwriter from Los Angeles, California. He is best known for his production with notable hip hop artists such as Kendrick Lamar, Drake, Travis Scott, Schoolboy Q, Overdoz, and ASAP Rocky, among others. Aside from his solo production, Riera was previously a member of the Grammy nominated Los Angeles production duo THC. Riera scored his first Grammy nomination as a producer for the Drake track "U with Me?", produced with 40, Kanye West, DJ Dahi, Axlfolie, Vinylz and Oz, from the second best selling album of 2016, Views. Riera most recently contributed twice on Kendrick Lamar's much anticipated third studio album Damn, producing on the tracks "Element", produced with Sounwave, James Blake, Tae Beast and Bekon, and "God" produced with DJ Dahi, Bekon, Cardo, Top Dawg, Yung Exclusive, Mike Hector and Teddy Walton.

== Production discography ==
=== Notable songs produced on major albums ===
List of songs as producer or co-producer, with performing artists, showing year released and album name and certification.

Title	Year	Performing artist(s)	Certifications	Album
"M.A.A.D City"	2012	Kendrick Lamar	RIAA: Platinum	Good Kid, M.A.A.D City
"Collard Greens"	2014	Schoolboy Q	RIAA: Platinum	Oxymoron
"Fine Whine" (featuring Future, Joe Fox and M.I.A.)	2015	ASAP Rocky	RIAA: Gold	At. Long. Last. A$AP
"Electric Body" (featuring Schoolboy Q)	2015	ASAP Rocky	RIAA: Gold	At. Long. Last. A$AP
"Clubhouse"	2015	Mac Miller		GO:OD AM
"U Wit Me?"	2016	Drake	RIAA: 4× Platinum	Views
"SDP Interlude"	2016	Travis Scott	RIAA: Platinum	Birds in the Trap Sing McKnight
"Element"	2017	Kendrick Lamar	RIAA: 2× Platinum	Damn
"God"	2017	Kendrick Lamar	RIAA: 2× Platinum	Damn
"New Choppa" (featuring ASAP Rocky)	2017	Playboi Carti		Playboi Carti
"Riviera" (featuring Joey Badass and Telana)	2017	ASAP Twelvyy		12

== Other songs ==
Kendrick Lamar - Section.80 (2011)

- 1. "Fuck Your Ethnicity"
- 5. "Tammy's Song (Her Evils)"
- 10. "Chapter Ten"

(2012)

- "Cartoons and Cereal"

Iman Omari- Energy (2011)

- 3. "Midnight"
- 5. "First Time" (featuring Joon)

Overdoz- Live For, Die For (2011)

- 1."Live For, Die For"
- 2. "Before We Go On"
- 3. "Don't Wanna Be Your GF" (featuring Skeme)
- 5. "It Girl"
- 8. "Pasadena"
- 9. "The Function"
- 10."Wanna Know Your Name" (featuring Casey Veggies)
- 11. "Come First"
- 12. "Taking Me Down" (featuring Kendrick Lamar)
- 14. "Got Me F**ked Up"
- 15. "Counting My Money" (featuring Dom Kennedy)

Dom Kennedy- Yellow Album (2012)

- 1. "So Elastic"
- 5. "Girls On Stage"
- 6. "Don't Call Me" (featuring Too Short)
- 7. "5.0"

Schoolboy Q- Habits & Contradictions- (2012)

- 4. "Sex Drive" (featuring Jhené Aiko)
- 5. "Oxy Music"

Skeme- Alive and Living (2012)

- "Kidz With Gunz (featuring Schoolboy Q)

Overdoz- BOOM (2013)

- 1. "Underground" (featuring Pimp C)
- 2. "These Niggas" (featuring Nipsey Hussle)
- 3. "FSWAD"
- 5. "Destos Don't Stress Hoes"
- 6. "Killer Tofu"
- 8. "De$tabil"
- 10. "Barbary Coast"
- 11."When I Woke Up"
- 12."Thinkin"
- 13. "Lois Lane"

Nipsey Hussle- Mailbox Money- (2014)

- 8. "Between Us" (featuring K Camp)
- 10. "Stay Loyal" (featuring J. Stone)
- 12. "No N***a Like Me" (featuring Trae Tha Truth)
