= DNA (Kendrick Lamar song) =

Song by Kendrick Lamar

from the album Damn
- Released: April 14, 2017
- Recorded: 2016–2017
- Genre: West Coast hip hop • political hip hop • trap
- Length: 3:05
- Label: Top Dawg; Aftermath; Interscope
- Songwriters: Kendrick Duckworth; Michael Williams II
- Producer: Mike Will Made It

Music video
- "DNA" on YouTube

"DNA" (stylized as "DNA.") is a song by American rapper Kendrick Lamar from his fourth studio album Damn. Despite not being released as a single, the song received support at rhythmic radio after its official music video was released. The second track on the album (thirteenth on the Collector's Edition of Damn), it was written by Lamar, while the production was handled by Mike Will Made It.

The song's music video was released on April 18, 2017, and features American actor Don Cheadle.

== Recording and production ==
"DNA" was the second song from Damn to be recorded by Lamar and Mike Will, after "Humble". After the first verse was recorded with the beat that Mike Will had already prepared, Lamar started rapping the second verse a capella, requesting that Mike Will build the beat around the rap. Lamar proposed that it sound like "chaos", and Mike Will put together the second half of the song with the intention to make it "sound like he's battling the beat". The song samples "Mary Jane" by Rick James.

== Critical reception ==
The song has been described as "the most virtuosic display" on Damn by Vice. Entertainment Weekly praised the song as "technically peerless" and Lamar's "astonishing flow". Music critic Neil McCormick, for The Telegraph, called "DNA" a "punchy electro mantra about identity".

Billboard named "DNA" as the thirty-first best song of the year in their list of the 100 best songs of the year.

== Music video ==
The song's music video, directed by Nabil Elderkin and released on April 18, 2017, features American actor Don Cheadle. The video, directed by Nabil and The Little Homies, begins with Cheadle entering an interrogation room, where Lamar is being held captive and attached to a lie detector machine. After Cheadle mocks Lamar, he turns the machine on where he's shocked with Lamar's life force and begins rapping the track. From here, Cheadle and Lamar switch back and forth from rapping the song, mirroring each other's movements along the way until Cheadle finally succumbs to Lamar and lets him go. Afterwards, scenes of Lamar rapping alone along with some of his friends, including American rapper Schoolboy Q, follow. The video ends with an extended outro for the song, as Schoolboy Q approaches and punches the camera in slow motion. The video features the use of Chinese in the second half, with Kendrick subtitled "功夫肯尼" ("Kung Fu Kenny", an alternate name used throughout the Damn album) and Kendrick's crew being given "的家庭" (De jiātíng; supposed to mean "the family", the phrase by itself is grammatically incorrect, as it means "-'s family"). The Top Dawg Entertainment logo is presented alongside "顶级狗娱乐" (Dǐngjí gǒu yúlè, literally "top level dog entertainment").

Upon release, the music video received positive reviews from critics.

== Live performances ==
Lamar performed "DNA" at the Coachella Valley Music and Arts Festival on April 23, 2017. Lamar also performed "DNA" on The Damn Tour. He also performed the song at the 60th Annual Grammy Awards. He also performed "DNA" at the Super Bowl LIX halftime show.

== Usage in media ==
An unreleased version of the song, with a new verse, was used during ESPN's coverage of the 2017 NBA Finals, and Lamar also appeared in accompanying promos. It was also used to introduce NBA Live 18 in promotional material. The song was also used as a part of Madden NFL 18's soundtrack, along with NBA Live 18.

The song was featured in a Beats headphones commercial starring New England Patriots quarterback Tom Brady. The song was also featured in a Beats X commercial featuring DJ Khaled.

The song was also featured on Apple's HomePod smart speaker advertisement named "Beat".

The song is featured in the first trailer for Creed II.

On October 12, 2018, the soundtrack for the film The Hate U Give featured the song.

The song appears in the third episode of the Hulu science fiction series Utopia Falls.

The song was played to close Dave Chappelle's 2019 stand-up special Sticks & Stones.

The song was also featured in the launch trailer of Mortal Kombat 11: Aftermath expansion.

== Credits and personnel ==
Credits adapted from the official Damn digital booklet.

- Kendrick Lamar – vocals, songwriter
- Mike Will Made It – songwriter, producer
- Matt Schaeffer – additional guitar
- Derek Ali – mixing
- Tyler Page – mix assistant
- Cyrus Taghipour – mix assistant

== Charts ==
=== Weekly charts ===
Chart (2017)	Peak position
Australia (ARIA)	16
Austria (Ö3 Austria Top 40)	30
Canada Hot 100 (Billboard)	3
Czech Republic Singles Digital (ČNS IFPI)	34
Denmark (Tracklisten)	28
France (SNEP)	38
Germany (GfK)	37
Hungary (Stream Top 40)	29
Ireland (IRMA)	12
Italy (FIMI)	62
Netherlands (Single Top 100)	31
New Zealand (Recorded Music NZ)	5
Norway (VG-lista)	32
Portugal (AFP)	7
Scottish Singles Sales (Official Charts)	78
Slovakia Singles Digital (ČNS IFPI)	17
Sweden (Sverigetopplistan)	37
Switzerland (Schweizer Hitparade)	25
UK Singles (Official Charts)	18
US Billboard Hot 100	4
US Hot R&B/Hip-Hop Songs (Billboard)	3

=== Year-end charts ===
Chart (2017)	Position
Canada (Canadian Hot 100)	61
Portugal (AFP)	100
US Billboard Hot 100	62
US Hot R&B/Hip-Hop Songs (Billboard)	29

== Certifications ==
Region	Certification	Certified units/sales
Australia (ARIA)	5× Platinum	350,000^{‡}
Austria (IFPI Austria)	Gold	15,000^{‡}
Canada (Music Canada)	5× Platinum	400,000^{‡}
Denmark (IFPI Danmark)	Platinum	90,000^{‡}
France (SNEP)	Platinum	200,000^{‡}
Germany (BVMI)	Gold	200,000^{‡}
Italy (FIMI)	Gold	25,000^{‡}
New Zealand (RMNZ)	4× Platinum	120,000^{‡}
Poland (ZPAV)	Gold	25,000^{‡}
Spain (Promusicae)	Gold	30,000^{‡}
United Kingdom (BPI)	Platinum	600,000^{‡}
United States (RIAA)	3× Platinum	3,000,000^{‡}
^{‡} Sales+streaming figures based on certification alone.
