= Loyalty (Kendrick Lamar song) =

Single by Kendrick Lamar featuring Rihanna

from the album Damn
- Released: June 20, 2017
- Recorded: 2016
- Studio: No Excuses (Santa Monica, CA); Windmark Studios (Los Angeles, CA)
- Genre: Hip-hop; R&B
- Length: 3:47
- Label: Top Dawg; Aftermath; Interscope
- Songwriters: Kendrick Duckworth; Dacoury Natche; Mark Spears; Robyn Fenty; Anthony Tiffith; Bruno Mars; Philip Lawrence; Christopher Brody Brown; Robert Diggs; Russell Jones; Shawn Carter; Ricardo Thomas; Malik Cox; Calvin Broadus
- Producers: DJ Dahi; Sounwave; Martin; Top Dawg

Kendrick Lamar singles chronology
"Perfect Pint" (2017)	"Loyalty" (2017)	"New Freezer" (2017)

Rihanna singles chronology
"Wild Thoughts" (2017)	"Loyalty" (2017)	"Lemon" (2017)

Audio sample
- file; help

Music video
- "Loyalty" on YouTube

"Loyalty" (stylized as "LOYALTY.") is a song by American rapper Kendrick Lamar featuring Barbadian singer Rihanna from the former's fourth studio album Damn, released on April 14, 2017. The song was later sent to urban and rhythmic radio June 20, 2017, as the second single from the album. The sixth track on the album (ninth on the Collector's Edition of Damn), the song was written by the artists alongside producers DJ Dahi, Sounwave, Terrace Martin, and Anthony "Top Dawg" Tiffith. The song won the Grammy Award for Best Rap/Sung Performance.

== Composition ==
The song contains a reverse sample of "24K Magic" produced by Shampoo Press & Curl and The Stereotypes, and performed by American singer Bruno Mars. The song also contains a "replay" of Jay-Z's "Get Your Mind Right Mami" from his fifth album The Dynasty: Roc La Familia (2000), which can be heard at its 40-second mark.

== Critical reception ==
Complex calls it a "standout track" and one of Damn's most "radio-friendly cuts". The Fader writer Jason Parham calls "Loyalty", "anxious, berserk, and beautifully intransigent in [its] own right" and "equal parts pop, funk, and brooding rap hymnal". Frank Guan of Vulture enjoyed the song, especially Rihanna's part, saying "though only eight bars, Rihanna's sung rap is as fluent as it is brief, a swift and casual tour of her accomplishments." Rap-Up called the song a "standout track that allows Kung Fu Kenny and Bad Gal RiRi to address allegiance from a variety of angles".

== Awards and nominations ==
Year	Organization	Award	Result	Ref.
2018	BET Awards	Best Collaboration	Nominated	
2018	BET Hip Hop Awards	Best Hip Hop Video	Nominated	
2018	Grammy Awards	Best Rap/Sung Performance	Won	
2018	NAACP Image Awards	Outstanding Duo, Group or Collaboration	Won	

== Music video ==
The music video for the song was released to Lamar's Vevo channel on YouTube on July 28, 2017. It was directed by Dave Meyers and The Little Homies and includes an appearance from featured artist Rihanna. Jordan Darville of The Fader gave the music video a positive review, praising the visuals and called Lamar and Rihanna's adventure together "carefully crafted [and] suitably amorous."

== Credits and personnel ==
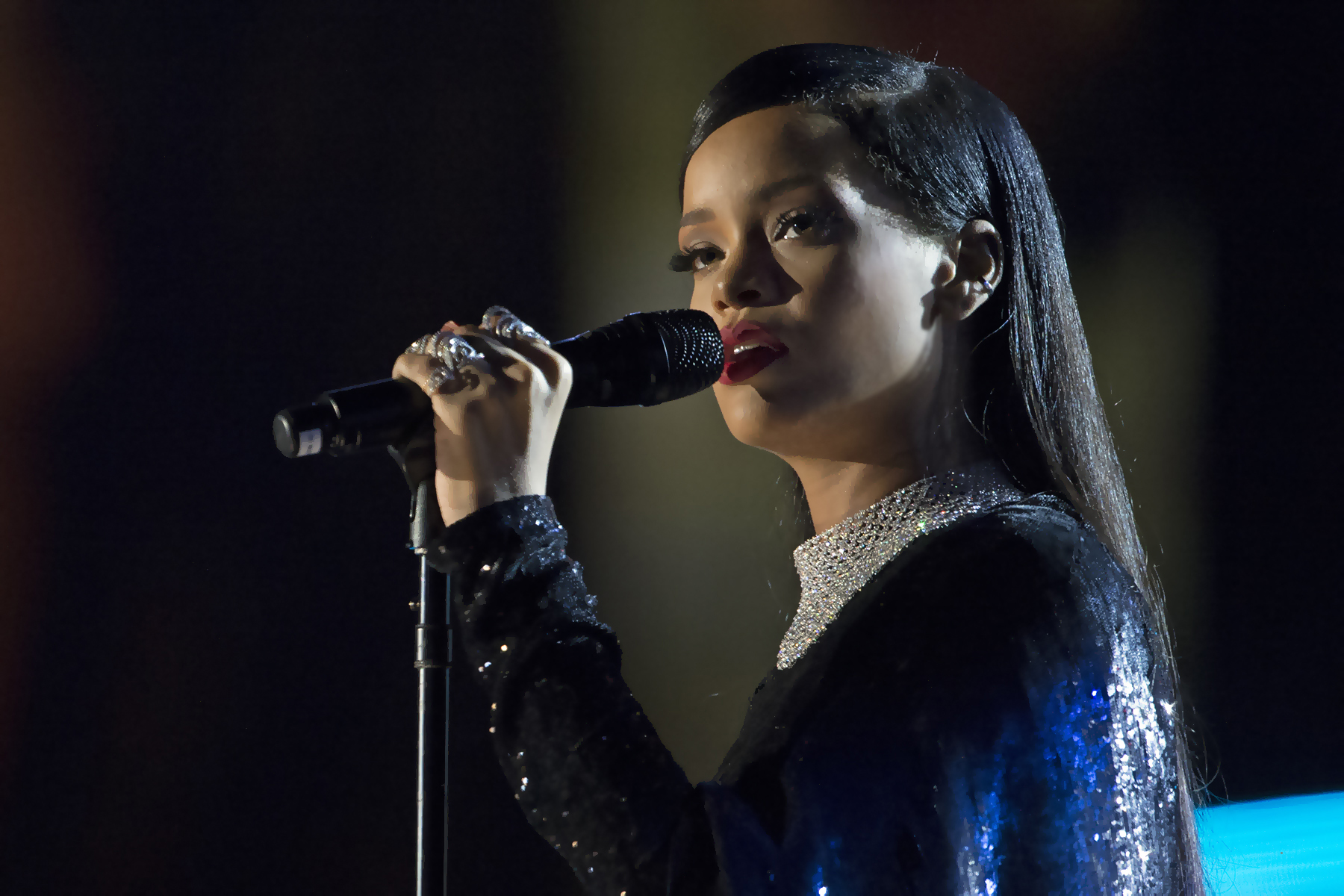
Rihanna is a featured vocalist on "Loyalty".

- Kendrick Duckworth – songwriter
- Rihanna – vocals, songwriter
- Dacoury Natche – songwriter, producer, additional vocals
- Byron "Mr. Talkbox" Chambers – additional vocals
- Mark Spears – songwriter, producer
- Terrace Martin – songwriter, producer
- Anthony "Topdawg" Tiffith – songwriter, producer
- Bruno Mars – songwriter
- Philip Lawrence – songwriter
- Christopher Brody Brown – songwriter
- Ol' Dirty Bastard – songwriter
- RZA – songwriter
- Jay-Z – songwriter
- Memphis Bleek – songwriter
- Snoop Dogg – songwriter
- Rick Rock – songwriter
- Bēkon – additional production and vocals
- Kid Capri – additional vocals
- Derek Ali – mixing
- Tyler Page – mix assistant
- Jamal Owens - Master mixer

== Charts ==
=== Weekly charts ===
Chart (2017)	Peak position
Australia (ARIA)	20
Australia Urban (ARIA)	4
Austria (Ö3 Austria Top 40)	41
Belgium (Ultratip Bubbling Under Flanders)	30
Canada Hot 100 (Billboard)	12
Czech Republic Singles Digital (ČNS IFPI)	40
Denmark (Tracklisten)	34
France (SNEP)	43
Germany (GfK)	53
Hungary (Stream Top 40)	36
Ireland (IRMA)	18
Italy (FIMI)	63
Netherlands (Single Top 100)	42
New Zealand (Recorded Music NZ)	15
Philippines (Philippine Hot 100)	47
Portugal (AFP)	10
Scottish Singles Sales (Official Charts)	99
Slovakia Singles Digital (ČNS IFPI)	20
Sweden (Sverigetopplistan)	34
Switzerland (Schweizer Hitparade)	35
UK Singles (Official Charts)	27
US Billboard Hot 100	14
US Hot R&B/Hip-Hop Songs (Billboard)	7
US Rhythmic Airplay (Billboard)	1

=== Year-end charts ===
Chart (2017)	Position
US Billboard Hot 100	66
US Hot R&B/Hip-Hop Songs (Billboard)	33
US Rhythmic (Billboard)	21

== Certifications ==
Region	Certification	Certified units/sales
Australia (ARIA)	3× Platinum	210,000^{‡}
Brazil (Pro-Música Brasil)	Platinum	60,000^{‡}
Canada (Music Canada)	3× Platinum	240,000^{‡}
Denmark (IFPI Danmark)	Gold	45,000^{‡}
France (SNEP)	Gold	100,000^{‡}
New Zealand (RMNZ)	3× Platinum	90,000^{‡}
United Kingdom (BPI)	Platinum	600,000^{‡}
United States (RIAA)	2× Platinum	2,000,000^{‡}
^{‡} Sales+streaming figures based on certification alone.

== Release history ==
Country	Date	Format	Label	Ref.
United States	June 20, 2017	Rhythmic contemporary radio	Top Dawg; Aftermath; Interscope	
United States	June 20, 2017	Urban contemporary radio	Top Dawg; Aftermath; Interscope	
Italy	October 20, 2017	Contemporary hit radio	Universal	
