= Alright (Kendrick Lamar song) =

2015 single by Kendrick Lamar

Single by Kendrick Lamar

from the album To Pimp a Butterfly
- Released: June 30, 2015
- Recorded: 2014–15
- Genre: Conscious hip-hop; jazz rap; gospel
- Length: 3:39
- Label: Top Dawg; Aftermath; Interscope
- Songwriters: Kendrick Duckworth; Pharrell Williams; Mark Spears
- Producers: Pharrell Williams; Sounwave

Kendrick Lamar singles chronology
| "Bad Blood" (2015) | "Alright" (2015) | "These Walls" (2015) |

Music video
- "Alright" on YouTube

"Alright" is a song by American rapper Kendrick Lamar featured on his third studio album, To Pimp a Butterfly (2015). The song expresses ideas of hope amid personal struggles and was co-produced by Pharrell Williams. "Alright" was released to radio stations as the album's fourth single on June 30, 2015. Many music publications considered it among the best songs and videos of the year. "Alright" received four nominations at the 58th Grammy Awards: Song of the Year, Best Music Video, Best Rap Performance and Best Rap Song, winning the latter two. It was also nominated for a MTV Video Music Award for Video of the Year.

The song was associated with the Black Lives Matter movement after several youth-led protests were heard chanting the chorus. Publications such as Rolling Stone, People, and Complex noted the song's importance in the protests calling "Alright" the "unifying soundtrack" of the movement. In 2019, it was named the best song of the 2010s by Pitchfork. Lamar, alongside notable artists Snoop Dogg, Dr. Dre, Eminem, Mary J. Blige, and 50 Cent, performed "Alright" at the Super Bowl LVI halftime show on February 13, 2022.

In 2024, the song appeared on Williams' soundtrack album Piece by Piece (Music from the Motion Picture).

== Inspiration and structure ==
In an interview with MTV News, Lamar stated that he found inspiration for "Alright" while visiting South Africa and witnessing problems that locals faced: "their struggle was ten times harder." The track opens with lines from Alice Walker's The Color Purple, "Alls my life, I had to fight". In "Alright", Lamar introduces a character named Lucy, who plays an essential role throughout the album. In the track's lyrics, as Lamar gets bigger, so does Lucy: "ain't a profit big enough to feed you". At the end of the track, Lamar discusses suicidal thoughts once in a hotel room "I didn't wanna self-destruct... The evils of Lucy was all around me." Musically, the track features marching band propulsion and a jazz band's breezy reeds. For his sole production credit, Pharrell Williams, who made the track with Digi+Phonics' member Sounwave, sings the hook.

== Recording ==
Pharrell Williams produced the song's instrumental in 2014, originally intending it for Fabolous. After hearing the beat, Lamar immediately began to write lyrics for the song, however, he initially felt that it didn't mesh well with jazz and funk influences of To Pimp a Butterfly. Sounwave then worked with Terrace Martin to incorporate drums into the instrumental, which led to Lamar approving the song for the album.

== Critical reception ==
"Alright" received widespread critical acclaim from music critics. Ranked number one on Pitchfork's "The 100 Best Tracks of 2015" and "The 200 Best Songs of the 2010s", an editor praised the chorus "We gon' be alright," and described it as "an ebulliently simple five-syllable refrain, a future-tense assertion of delivery to a better, more peaceful place," adding "In more than one instance, the song's chorus was chanted at Black Lives Matter protests. It has soundtracked a movement." Consequence of Sound also ranked the song number one on its "Top 50 Songs of 2015" list, the magazine's editors described the song as "buoyant, festive, serious, personal, and all-encompassing. Only a song so brilliant in so many ways could earn the honor of becoming a protest song ... 'Alright' isn't about determination; it's about forgetting cold, harsh reality and hoping for something brighter and better if only for three minutes and 39 seconds." Complex magazine quoted an organizer of a Black Lives Matter protest in Denver: "Music uplifts our community, and so we were playing different songs that have been our ‘struggle anthems’ to equality so that black people can say their lives matter," he explains. "And so Kendrick's song is something that is a rallying cry."

For The New York Times, writer Nate Chinen placed the song atop his "The Best Songs of 2015" list, adding "the verses harbor a (more) internal struggle – and some of Kendrick Lamar's most inspired showboating as a rapper." Billboard ranked "Alright" at number eight on its year-end list of 2015: "Lamar made the struggle his message on the soul-stirring To Pimp a Butterfly cut "Alright." ... The fight-the-power anthem became the nation's rallying cry in 2015, especially for the Black Lives Matter movement. The plight of police brutality victims can be heard in every breath Lamar takes on "Alright" as he tackles society's ills with resilience: "Homie you fucked up/But if God got us then we gon' be alright." In a second list for the year's best hip-hop songs, Billboard placed "Alright" at number three. Village Voice named "Alright" the fourth-best single released in 2015 on their annual year-end critics' poll, Pazz & Jop. Newsday's editor Glenn Gamboa also ranked it as the best song of the year. In 2018, Rolling Stone placed the song at number 13 on their list of the "100 Greatest Songs of the Century So Far," and in 2021 and again in 2024, they ranked "Alright" at #45 on their list of the "500 Greatest Songs of All Time." In 2018, Billboard ranked the song number four on their list of the 20 greatest Kendrick Lamar songs, and in 2021, Rolling Stone ranked the song number two on their list of the 50 greatest Kendrick Lamar songs.

== Music video ==
=== Release and synopsis ===
Lamar atop a traffic light pole in the black-and-white video

Lamar was spotted filming the song's music video on Treasure Island in San Francisco, California and atop a traffic light pole in Los Angeles, California. It was released on Lamar's Vevo page on June 30, 2015. The seven-minute-long clip, directed by Colin Tilley and The Little Homies, was filmed entirely in black-and-white.

The music video starts by showing shots of life in a neighborhood. A young African-American man is seen lying on the ground and Lamar begins speaking. Police and destruction flood the scene as the music starts, and Lamar begins rapping a new verse alongside his Black Hippy cohorts (ScHoolboy Q, Ab-Soul, and Jay Rock), in a car carried by four police officers. During the video, Lamar flies through California, while his crew is throwing out money to everybody and dancers perform in the streets. At the end of the music video, Lamar stands on a lamppost and a policeman shoots him down. The rapper falls to the ground finishing his monologue from the beginning of the video, but ends the clip with a smile.

=== Reception ===
I wanted to have this m.A.A.d. city concept in there first. It basically shows the state of everything that's going on in the world right now. It's also showing how one man can basically spread positivity through all of the madness that's going on and how everything is gonna be alright [...] The video starts off so dark and it just progresses and gets lighter and lighter as it goes.

— Director Colin Tilley talking about the music video concept in an interview with MTV.

Pitchfork ranked it as the best music video of 2015, highlighting "Lamar's own flight above the streets of L.A., his inner-city Icarus providing one of the most arresting – and liberating – images of the year." Consequence of Sound listed the video at number one on its "Top 5 Music Videos of 2015", concluding "The video works as a microcosm of the sad and wretched state of many cities: crooked cops, burning cars, abandoned buildings, and bleak backdrops of an urban sprawl. It's powerful, harrowing, bleak, and hopeful all at once." Spin also listed the clip atop its "The 25 Best Music Videos of 2015".

Eric Ducker for Rolling Stone wrote "Lamar emerges as a charismatic but vulnerable superhero, flying through the city and doing donuts in a parking lot as a kid gleefully sits shotgun," and also commended the director Colin Tilley's work, "he creates a starker experience befitting one of the most ambitious albums by a major artist in recent history. Tilley rises to the challenge of matching Lamar's beautifully complex and conflicted vision." The editor listed it at number six on his best music videos of 2015 article. Slant Magazine staff named it the 4th best video of the year. The music video received seven nominations at the 2015 MTV Video Music Awards, including Video of the Year, Best Male Video and Best Direction, ultimately winning the latter. Furthermore, it received a nomination for Grammy Award for Best Music Video. Since April 2025, the music video has amassed 186 million views on YouTube.

== Live performances ==
Lamar performed the song for the first time at the 15th BET Awards on June 28, 2015. The performance featured Lamar standing on a graffiti-embossed police car flanked by a gigantic battered American flag. Geraldo Rivera of Fox News called the performance "disgusting", and criticized Lamar, stating that "Hip Hop has done more damage to African Americans than racism in recent years". Lamar, later, responded to the comments with a short video questioning Rivera's claim, stating "How can you take a message of hope and turn it into hate?" Lamar later used audio of Rivera's comments in his song "DNA", and mentioned Rivera in the song "YAH".

In 2015, Lamar and Pharrell Williams performed the song together at LA radio station Power 106's annual Cali Christmas concert. Lamar performed a medley of "The Blacker the Berry" and "Alright" at the 58th Grammy Awards. It was ranked by Rolling Stone and Billboard as the best performance and best moment of the night, with the latter writing "It was easily one of the best live TV performances in history".

"Alright" was featured on his 2015 Kunta's Groove Sessions tour. Lamar performed "Alright" at every show on The Damn Tour.

The song was performed by Lamar in the Super Bowl LVI halftime show on February 13, 2022.

== Impact ==
In 2015, several youth-led protests against police brutality across the country were heard chanting the chorus to "Alright". Rolling Stone's writer Greg Tate commented: "Lamar's 'Alright' has been touted by many a comrade in today's student activist cadre as their 'We Shall Overcome'". Additionally, several contemporary progressive news outlets, including BET, raised the idea of "Alright" being the modern Black National Anthem. Lamar was featured on Ebony Power 100, annual list that recognizes many leaders of the African-American community, emphasizing "how the chorus of his song "Alright" became a chant for Black Lives Matter protestors". Producer Sounwave stated "I didn't expect "Alright" to be the protest song but I did know it was going to do something because the time we're living in made it the perfect song." Protestors at a Chicago rally against Donald Trump chanted the chorus of the song in March 2016.

== Usage in media ==
Kendrick Lamar made a cameo in a promo ad for ABC sitcom Black-ish. A minute-long clip was released featuring Lamar's song in a music video the show's Johnson kids create to become an "overnight viral sensation." The remainder of the promo ad moves into a music video setting where the Black-ish casts raps along to "Alright" while Lamar himself sits on the family couch munching on snacks.

On January 25, 2016, the Grammys released a promotional video where Compton residents rap along to "Alright" before Lamar joins them at the end.

This song was featured during the end credits of The First Purge.

A mashup of "No Woman, No Cry" and "Alright" is featured in the official trailer for 2022 film Black Panther: Wakanda Forever.

In 2023, Beyoncé, during her Renaissance World Tour, incorporated elements of "Alright", along with her own "My Power" and "Black Parade", during a dance break with her daughter, Blue Ivy Carter.

In 2024, the song appeared on Williams' documentary film Piece by Piece.

The song was featured in the soundtrack for MLB The Show 25, along with his song “Reincarnated”.

== Personnel ==
- James "The White Black Man" Hunt – recording
- Derek "MixedByAli" Ali – mixing
- Terrace Martin – alto saxophone
- Pharrell Williams – background vocals
- Candace Wakefield – background vocals
- Stephen "Thundercat" Bruner – background vocals

== Accolades ==
| Year | Organization | Award | Result | Ref. |
|---|---|---|---|---|
| 2015 | MTV Video Music Awards | Video of the Year | Nominated | |
| 2015 | MTV Video Music Awards | Best Male Video | Nominated | |
| 2015 | MTV Video Music Awards | Best Hip-Hop Video | Nominated | |
| 2015 | MTV Video Music Awards | Best Direction | Won | |
| 2015 | BET Hip Hop Awards | Best Hip Hop Video | Won | |
| 2015 | BET Hip Hop Awards | Impact Track | Won | |
| 2015 | BET Hip Hop Awards | Track of the Year | Nominated | |
| 2015 | MTV Europe Music Awards | Best Video | Nominated | |
| 2015 | Soul Train Music Awards | Best Video of the Year | Nominated | |
| 2015 | Soul Train Music Awards | Rhythm & Bars Award | Won | |
| 2015 | Camerimage | Best Music Video | Won | |
| 2015 | Camerimage | Best Cinematography In A Music Video | Won | |
| 2016 | Grammy Awards | Song of the Year | Nominated | |
| 2016 | Grammy Awards | Best Rap Performance | Won | |
| 2016 | Grammy Awards | Best Rap Song | Won | |
| 2016 | Grammy Awards | Best Music Video | Nominated | |
| 2016 | BET Awards | Video of the Year | Nominated | |

== Charts ==
Chart performance for "Alright"
| Chart (2015) | Peak position |
|---|---|
| Belgium Urban (Ultratop Flanders) | 44 |
| UK Hip Hop/R&B (Official Charts) | 20 |
| US Billboard Hot 100 | 81 |
| US Hot R&B/Hip-Hop Songs (Billboard) | 24 |
| US Rhythmic Airplay (Billboard) | 35 |

2025 chart performance for "Alright"
| Chart (2025) | Peak position |
|---|---|
| Global 200 (Billboard) | 175 |

== Certifications ==
Certifications for "Alright"
| Region | Certification | Certified units/sales |
|---|---|---|
| Australia (ARIA) | 3× Platinum | 210,000^{‡} |
| Brazil (Pro-Música Brasil) | Gold | 30,000^{‡} |
| Canada (Music Canada) | 2× Platinum | 160,000^{‡} |
| Denmark (IFPI Danmark) | Gold | 45,000^{‡} |
| New Zealand (RMNZ) | 3× Platinum | 90,000^{‡} |
| Poland (ZPAV) | Gold | 25,000^{‡} |
| United Kingdom (BPI) | Platinum | 600,000^{‡} |
| United States (RIAA) | Platinum | 1,000,000^{‡} |
^{‡} Sales+streaming figures based on certification alone.
