= Tyler Reese =

American musician (born 1993)

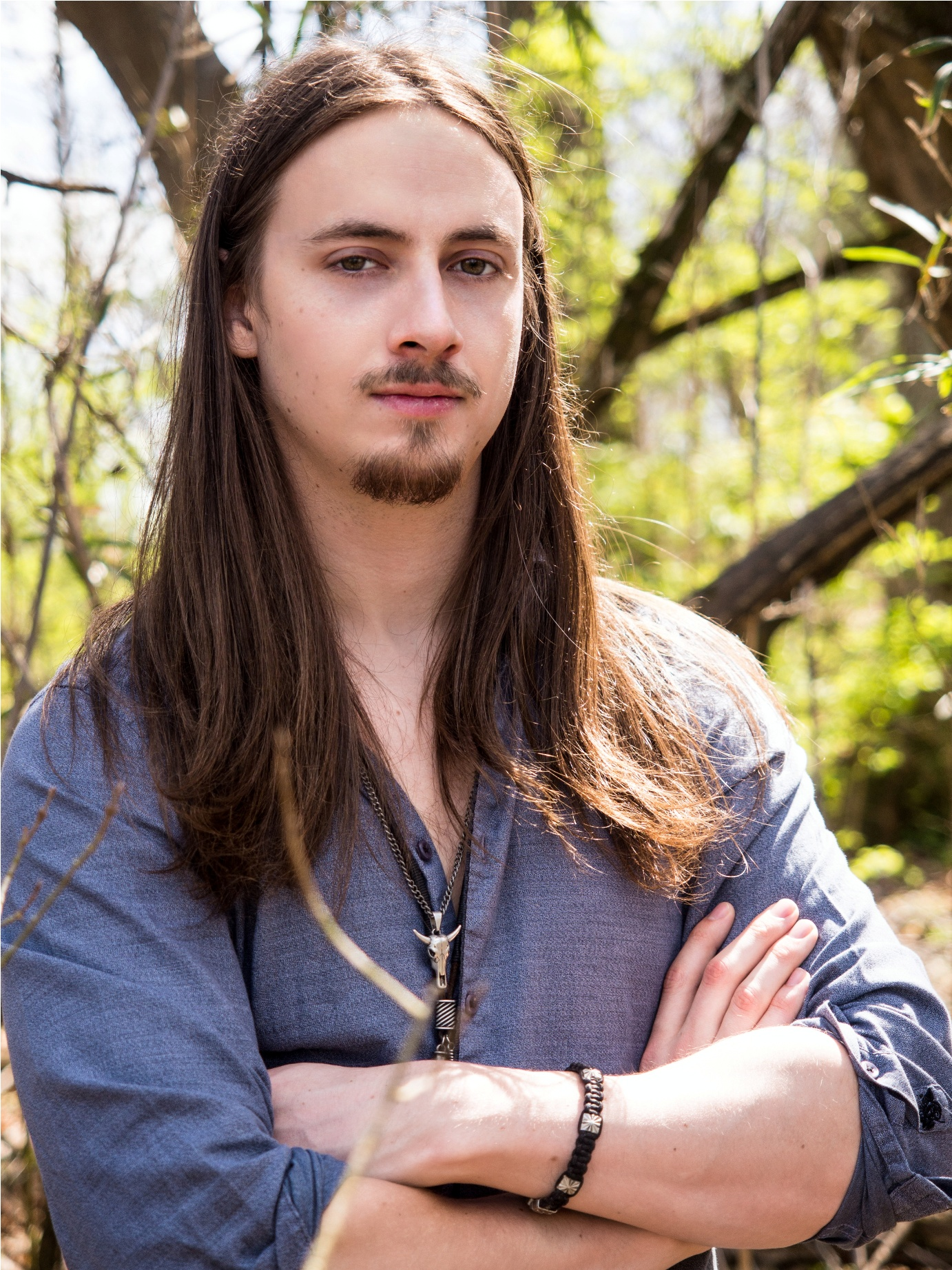
- Tyler Reese

Background information
- Born: Tyler Andrew Reese; June 23, 1993 (age 32); Norfolk, Virginia
- Origin: Nashville, Tennessee
- Genres: Jazz, rock, funk, blues
- Occupations: Guitarist, songwriter, music producer
- Years active: 2010-present
- Website: tylerreesemusic.com

Tyler Andrew Reese (born June 23, 1993) is an American guitarist, studio and session player, songwriter and music producer based in Nashville, Tennessee.

== Biography ==
Reese was born in 1993, Norfolk, Virginia, to Dr. William Andrew Reese, a navy physician and Lisa Dyal Reese, a nurse. The family moved to Fredericksburg, Virginia in the summer of 1994 where Reese spent the rest of his childhood through high school. Reese was started on piano theory at age of three with his grandmother, Edith Colvin Dyal, a piano educator who received her PhD from Teachers College, Columbia University. Reese studied piano through age 18. He started guitar at age 10, and focused on jazz guitar from age 14. In his high school years, Reese also played tenor saxophone. After graduating High School in 2011, Reese attended the Berklee College of Music in Boston, MA. In 2013, Reese left Boston and moved to Nashville where he pursued a career as a studio and session guitarist. In the summer of 2013, Tyler studied at a Master's Clinic in Upstate NY with Pat Metheny.

== Career ==
Reese started his professional career in 2010 with release of his first album, Risus21. His second album, Because I Can was released in 2011. Because I Can was a mixture of traditional jazz music with aspects of funk, blues and rock music.

In 2014, Reese released his third album Life in 20. The album was co-written with Elisa Fiorillo-Dease from The NPG and co-produced with Dease and Jeff Silverman.

Reese has played as the lead guitarist for prominent musical groups and artists such as Craig Morgan, Prince, Ernie Isley, Benjie Porecki and Gary Grainger. Reese has also opened for Martin Sexton, Ron Holloway, Bo Bice and Scotty McCreery.

Reese released his fourth album, Reminiscence, in 2016. The album was produced by Jeff Silverman and Reese. Reese has written and co-written songs such as Moving On, 2Funk, Reflections and others. The song, Moving On, was nominated for 2016 Hollywood Music in Media Awards in the Jazz Category while 2Funk was also nominated in the Producer/Production Category. Moving On debuted at #5 on the Billboard Contemporary Jazz Album Chart and #12 on Billboard Best Jazz Album Chart in November 2016. 2Funk reached number 33 on SoundCloud for Jazz and Blues in September 2016. In November 2016, Reese became a sponsored artist with PRS Guitars.

== Discography ==
Title	Type	Year
Risus21	Album	2010
Because I Can	Album	2011
Simply to Choose feat. Kimberley Dahme	Single	2013
Life in 20	Album	2014
Reminiscence	Album	2016
