= The Heart Part 4 =

2017 promotional single by Kendrick Lamar

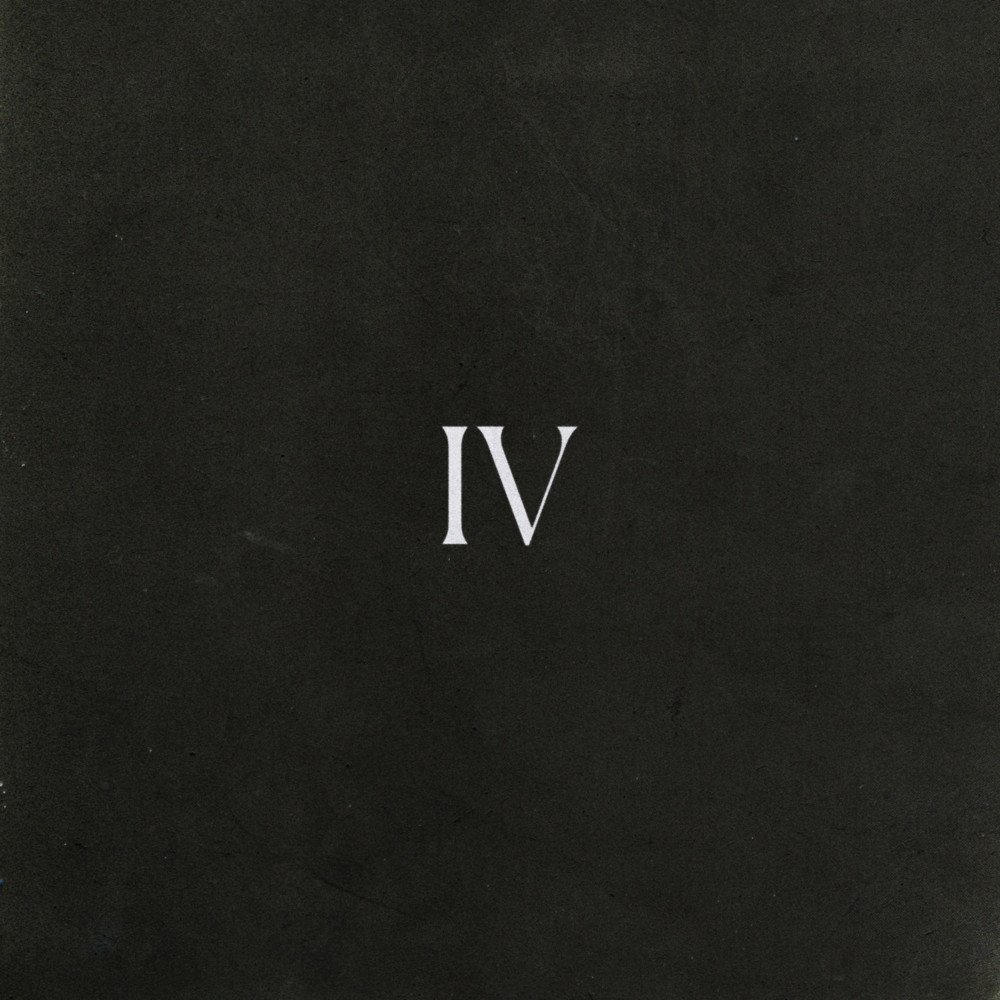

Promotional single by Kendrick Lamar
- Released: March 23, 2017
- Genre: Hip-hop
- Length: 4:48
- Label: Aftermath; Top Dawg; Interscope
- Songwriters: Kendrick Duckworth; Joshua Scruggs; Axel Morgan; Dacoury Natche; Daniel Maman; Khalid Robinson
- Producers: Syk Sense; Axlfolie; DJ Dahi; The Alchemist

"The Heart Part 4" is a song by American hip-hop recording artist Kendrick Lamar. It was released on March 23, 2017, by Top Dawg Entertainment. The track features uncredited vocals from American singer Khalid. The song contains samples from "Don't Tell a Lie about Me and I Won't Tell the Truth on You" by James Brown and "I Love You" by Faith Evans. It was released in advance of his fourth studio album Damn (2017).

== Background and release ==
On March 23, 2017, Lamar shared an Instagram post of the Roman numeral "IV" after deleting his prior Instagram posts. That night, Lamar released the song through streaming services.

This is the fourth installment in Lamar's "The Heart" song series. "The Heart Part 1" was released as a loose track in April 2010, while "The Heart Part 2" was featured on Lamar's Overly Dedicated mixtape, released later that same year. "The Heart Part 3", featuring Ab-Soul and Jay Rock, preceded the release of Good Kid, M.A.A.D City in 2012. In 2022, "The Heart Part 5" was released as a promotional single to promote Mr. Morale & the Big Steppers. Lamar continued the series with the inclusion of "Heart Pt. 6" as the tenth track of his 2024 album GNX.

He finishes the song with the line, "Y'all got 'til April the 7th to get y'all shit together", hinting at the release date for his fourth album (the date turned out to be the day pre-orders opened and the release date was announced to be April 14). The song mentions Donald Trump, while media outlets perceived it as a diss track to rappers Drake and Big Sean.

A portion of the instrumental, produced by The Alchemist, is used on the song "Fear" from Lamar's fourth album Damn (2017).

== Critical reception ==
On the day of its release, Pitchfork named it Best New Track. Entertainment Weekly's Eric Renner Brown stated that Lamar "infuses his boasts of success and wealth with a degree of lyrical nuance that elevates the track".

== Charts ==
Chart (2017)	Peak position
Australia (ARIA)	35
Australia Urban (ARIA)	2
Canada Hot 100 (Billboard)	25
France (SNEP)	47
Ireland (IRMA)	45
New Zealand Heatseekers (RMNZ)	2
Scottish Singles Sales (Official Charts)	64
Switzerland (Schweizer Hitparade)	41
UK Singles (Official Charts)	61
UK Hip Hop/R&B (Official Charts)	21
US Billboard Hot 100	22
US Hot R&B/Hip-Hop Songs (Billboard)	11
