= 2018 Kids' Choice Awards =

Children's television awards show program broadcast in 2018

- Date: March 24, 2018
- Location: The Forum; Inglewood, California
- Hosted by: John Cena
- Most awards: Jumanji: Welcome to the Jungle (2); Stranger Things (2)
- Most nominations: Jumanji: Welcome to the Jungle (3); The Big Bang Theory (3); The Thundermans (3); Taylor Swift (3)

Television/radio coverage
- Network: Nickelodeon; TeenNick (simulcast); Nicktoons (simulcast); Nick Radio
- Runtime: 91 minutes
- Viewership: 1.84 million
- Produced by: Elizabeth Kelly; Michael Dempsey; Jay Schmalholz; Shelly Sumpter Gillyard (executive producers)
- Directed by: Glenn Weiss

The 31st Annual Nickelodeon Kids' Choice Awards was held on March 24, 2018, at The Forum in Inglewood, California live on Nickelodeon and either live or on tape delay across all of Nickelodeon's international networks. This was the third time the award ceremony was held at The Forum as the 2015 and 2016 Kids' Choice Awards were also previously held there. John Cena returned as host of the ceremony for the second consecutive year. The show also gave an honor to the people protesting in the March for Our Lives movement that occurred on the same day, including other honors coming from award winners such as Millie Bobby Brown, Camila Cabello, Liza Koshy, and Zendaya.

A new episode of Henry Danger led into the ceremony, while a new episode of Knight Squad served as the lead-out.

== Hosts ==
- John Cena
- Daniella Monet (orange carpet)

== Performers ==
Artist(s)	Song(s)
JoJo Siwa	"Boomerang" "Hold The Drama" "Kid In A Candy Store"
N.E.R.D.	"Lemon"

== Presenters ==
Celebrity (ies)	Presented
Storm Reid; Hailee Steinfeld	Favorite TV Actress
Nick Cannon	Favorite Funny YouTube Creator
Kristen Bell; Grant Gustin	Favorite Breakout Artist
Channing Tatum; Zendaya; Yara Shahidi	Preview of Smallfoot
Chloe Kim; Patrick Schwarzenegger	Favorite TV Show
Jack Griffo; Kira Kosarin	Preview of Avengers: Infinity War
Mel B Heidi Klum	Favorite Movie Actress
Ben Schwartz; Kat Graham; Brandon Mychal Smith	Preview of Rise of the Teenage Mutant Ninja Turtles; Favorite Instagram Pet
Jace Norman	Awards Favorite Male Artist to Shawn Mendes
Laurie Hernandez	Barbie "I Can Do Anything" Segment
Lilimar; Owen Joyner; Daniella Perkins	Favorite TV Actor
John Cena dressed as Don Cena	Favorite Movie Actor
Jaden Smith	Introduced N.E.R.D.

== Winners and nominees ==
Nominations were announced on February 26, 2018. Unlike past years where the voting periods for all categories opened all at once, one genre opened up to voting per week, along with several show-only category voting windows. For the movie categories, voting was opened on February 26, with voting on music categories opened on March 5, television voting beginning on March 12, and a variety of miscellaneous categories on March 19. Winners are listed first and in boldface.

=== Movies ===
Favorite Movie	Favorite Movie Actor
**Jumanji: Welcome to the Jungle**; Beauty and the Beast; The Greatest Showman; Guardians of the Galaxy Vol. 2; Pitch Perfect 3; Spider-Man: Homecoming; Star Wars: The Last Jedi; Wonder Woman	**Dwayne Johnson** – Jumanji: Welcome to the Jungle as Dr. Smolder Bravestone; Ben Affleck – Justice League as Bruce Wayne / Batman; Will Ferrell – Daddy's Home 2 as Brad Whitaker; Kevin Hart – Jumanji: Welcome to the Jungle as Moose Finbar; Chris Hemsworth – Thor: Ragnarok as Thor; Chris Pratt – Guardians of the Galaxy Vol. 2 as Peter Quill / Star-Lord
Favorite Movie Actress	Favorite Animated Movie
**Zendaya** – Spider-Man: Homecoming as Michelle & The Greatest Showman as Anne Wheeler; Gal Gadot – Wonder Woman & Justice League as Diana Prince / Wonder Woman; Anna Kendrick – Pitch Perfect 3 as Beca; Daisy Ridley – Star Wars: The Last Jedi as Rey; Zoe Saldaña – Guardians of the Galaxy Vol. 2 as Gamora; Emma Watson – Beauty and the Beast as Belle	**Coco**; Captain Underpants: The First Epic Movie; Cars 3; Despicable Me 3; The Emoji Movie; Ferdinand; The Lego Batman Movie; Smurfs: The Lost Village

=== Television ===
Favorite TV Show	Favorite TV Actor
**Stranger Things**; The Big Bang Theory; The Flash; Fuller House; Henry Danger; K.C. Undercover; Power Rangers Ninja Steel; The Thundermans	**Jace Norman** – Henry Danger as Henry Hart; Jack Griffo – The Thundermans as Max Thunderman; Grant Gustin – The Flash as Barry Allen / Flash; Andrew Lincoln – The Walking Dead as Rick Grimes; Jim Parsons – The Big Bang Theory as Sheldon Cooper; William Shewfelt – Power Rangers Ninja Steel as Brody Romero / Red Ranger
Favorite TV Actress	Favorite Cartoon
**Millie Bobby Brown** – Stranger Things as Eleven; Candace Cameron Bure – Fuller House as D.J. Tanner-Fuller; Kaley Cuoco – The Big Bang Theory as Penny; Lizzy Greene – Nicky, Ricky, Dicky & Dawn as Dawn Harper; Kira Kosarin – The Thundermans as Phoebe Thunderman; Zendaya – K.C. Undercover as K.C. Cooper	**SpongeBob SquarePants**; ALVINNN!!! and the Chipmunks; The Loud House; The Simpsons; Teen Titans Go!; Teenage Mutant Ninja Turtles

=== Music ===
Favorite Music Group	Favorite Male Artist
**Fifth Harmony**; The Chainsmokers; Coldplay; Imagine Dragons; Maroon 5; Twenty One Pilots	**Shawn Mendes**; Luis Fonsi; DJ Khaled; Kendrick Lamar; Bruno Mars; Ed Sheeran
Favorite Female Artist	Favorite Song
**Demi Lovato**; Beyoncé; Selena Gomez; Katy Perry; P!nk; Taylor Swift	**"Shape of You"** – Ed Sheeran; "Despacito (Remix)" – Luis Fonsi & Daddy Yankee feat. Justin Bieber; "HUMBLE." – Kendrick Lamar; "I'm the One" – DJ Khaled feat. Justin Bieber, Quavo, Chance the Rapper & Lil Wayne; "It Ain't Me" – Kygo & Selena Gomez; "Look What You Made Me Do" – Taylor Swift; "That's What I Like" – Bruno Mars; "Thunder" – Imagine Dragons
Favorite Breakout Artist	Favorite Global Music Star
**Camila Cabello**; Alessia Cara; Cardi B; Noah Cyrus; Khalid; Harry Styles	**BTS**; Black Coffee; Zara Larsson; Lorde; Maluma; Taylor Swift; The Vamps

=== Miscellaneous ===
Favorite Funny YouTube Creator	Favorite Musical YouTube Creator
**Liza Koshy**; DanTDM; Dude Perfect; Markiplier; Miranda Sings; Alex Wassabi	**JoJo Siwa**; Ayo & Teo; Jack & Jack; Johnny Orlando; Jacob Sartorius; Why Don't We
Favorite Video Game	Favorite Instagram Pet
**Just Dance 2018**; Lego Marvel Super Heroes 2; Mario Kart 8 Deluxe; Minecraft: Java Edition; Star Wars Battlefront II; Super Mario Odyssey	**Jiffpom**; itsdougthepug; Juinperfoxx; Nala_Cat; Realdiddykong; RealGrumpyCat
Favorite Dance Trend
**"The Backpack Kid"/"Swish Swish"** – Russell Horning and Katy Perry on Saturday Night Live; "The Lemon Challenge" – N.E.R.D; "The Milly Rock", Jesse Lingard goal celebration; "The Rolex" – Ayo & Teo; "The Shoot Dance" – BlocBoy JB; "The Stir Fry" – Migos

== International nominations ==
The following are nominations for awards from Nickelodeon's international networks, which had the categories and awards presented during continuity during their individual airings of the main American ceremony.

Favorite Pinoy Newbie (Philippines)	Favorite African Star (Africa)
Loisa Andalio; Gabbi Garcia; Joshua Garcia; Iñigo Pascual	Eddy Kenzo (Uganda); Davido (Nigeria); Emmanuella (Nigeria); Diamond Platnumz (Tanzania); Cassper Nyovest (South Africa); Caster Semenya (South Africa)
Favorite Latin Music Star (Latin America)	Favorite Latin Web Star (Latin America)
CNCO; Morat; Oriana; Piso 21; Sebastian Yatra; Sofia Reyes	Los Polinesios; Dosogas; Luisito Comunica; Pautips; Mario Ruiz; Mica Suarez
Favorite Aussie/Kiwi Squad (Australia)	Favorite Aussie/Kiwi Rising Star (Australia)
5 Seconds of Summer; Bondi Rescue; The Matildas; Parri$ Goebel & The Royal Family	Olivia Deeble; Isabella Clark; Julian Dennison; Poppy Starr Olsen
Favorite Aussie/Kiwi Duo (Australia)	Favorite Aussie/Kiwi Streaming Sensation (Australia)
Bindi Irwin & Robert Irwin; Sarah Jane Betts & Kane Foster; Jono & Ben; Julia Morris & Chris Brown	Sia; Kings; Jessica Mauboy; Guy Sebastian
Favorite Aussie/Kiwi Ultimate Icon (Australia)	Favorite Internet Star (Belgium & Netherlands)
Chris Hemsworth; Lorde; Steve Smith; Taika Waititi	Girlys blog; Bibi; Nina Houston; Shane Kluivert; Nina Schotpoort; Stien
Favorite TV Series (Belgium & Netherlands)	Favorite Star (Belgium)
Bridge Class; Ghostrockers; The Ludwigs; Mees Kees; Nachtwacht; SpangaS	Laura Tesoro; Bab Buelens; Sean Dhondt; K3; Tinne Oltmans; Marie Verhulst
Favorite Brazilian Personality (Brazil)	Rising Star (Denmark)
LUBA; Malena; Luis Mariz; Mari Nolasco; Felipe Neto; Luccas Neto; Rezende Evil; Bibi Tatto	Rasmus Kolbe; Linnea Berthelsen; Emelie Briting; Lasse Vestergaard
Favorite Star (Denmark)	Favorite Vlogger (Denmark)
Marcus and Martinus; Zara Larsson; Joey Moe; Scarlet Pleasure	Alexander Husum; Rasmus Brohave; Victoria Garber; Julia Sofia
Favorite Muser (Denmark)	Favorite Twins (Germany, Austria, & Switzerland)
Oscar Rosenstroem; Amalie Anderson; Isabella & Flippa; Mathilde & Rosa	Marcus and Martinus; Die Lochis; Laila & Rosa Meinecke; Valentina & Cheyenne Pahde
Favorite Athlete (Germany, Austria, & Switzerland)	Favorite Big Kid (Germany, Austria, & Switzerland)
Jerome Boateng; freekickerz; Angelique Kerber; Andreas Wellinger	Julien Bam; Freshtorge; Samu Haber; Luke Mockridge
Favorite Cast (Germany, Austria, & Switzerland)	Favorite Muser (Germany, Austria, & Switzerland)
Fack ju Göhte 3; Windstorm 3: Windstorm and the Wild Horses; Spotlight; The Voice of Germany	Falco Punch; Laura Sophie; Mario Novembre; Selina Mour
Favorite Singer (Germany, Austria, & Switzerland)	Favorite Spanish Influence (Spain)
Mark Forster; Max Giesinger; Lina; Mike Singer	Ariann Music; The Grefg; La Diversion de Martina; Twin Melody
Favorite Artist (Spain)	Favorite Singer (Italy)
Ana Mena; Antonio Jose; Calum; Jose Maria Ruiz	RIKI; Annalisa; Michele Bravi; Thomas Grazioso; Shade
Favorite Webstar (Italy)	Favorite Internet Star (Middle East)
MeControTe; Iris Ferrari; iPantellas; Elisa Maino; Luciano Spinelli	Taim Al Falasi; Sherif Fayed; Noha Nabil; The Real Fouz; Saudi Reporters
Favorite Music Artist (Middle East)	Favorite Star (Netherlands)
Douzi; Abd El Fattah Grini; Maritta Hallani; Saad Ramadan	Ronnie Flex; Maan; Sarah and Julia; Vajen van den Bosch; Kaj van der Voort; Vinchenzo
Norwegian Sparklers (Norway)	Favorite Star (Norway)
Emma Ellingsen; Oselie Henden; Kattekryp; Ylva Johnsen Olaisen	Marcus and Martinus; Astrid S; Cezinando; Zara Larsson
Favorite Vlogger (Norway)	Favorite Muser (Norway)
Amalie Olsen; Herman Dahl; Tobias Fodnes; Hanna-Martine	Emelie Lein; Halvor Bakke; Elida Høgalmen; Sondre Rodriguez Pedersen
Swedish Sparklers (Sweden)	Favorite Star (Sweden)
Therése Lindgren; Felicia Bergström; Let's Feast; Thomas Sekelius	Zara Larsson; Marcus and Martinus; Peg Parnevik; Samir & Viktor
Favorite Singer (Greece)
Demy; Bo; Claydee; Eleni Foureira; Vangelis Kakouriotis; Anastasios Rammos

== Slimed celebrities ==
- Liza Koshy
- Mel B
- Heidi Klum
- JoJo Siwa
- Ashley Banjo
- Laurie Hernandez
- Barbie (animated segment)
- Shawn Mendes
- John Cena
