= Fear Factor: House of Fear =

Reality television competition show

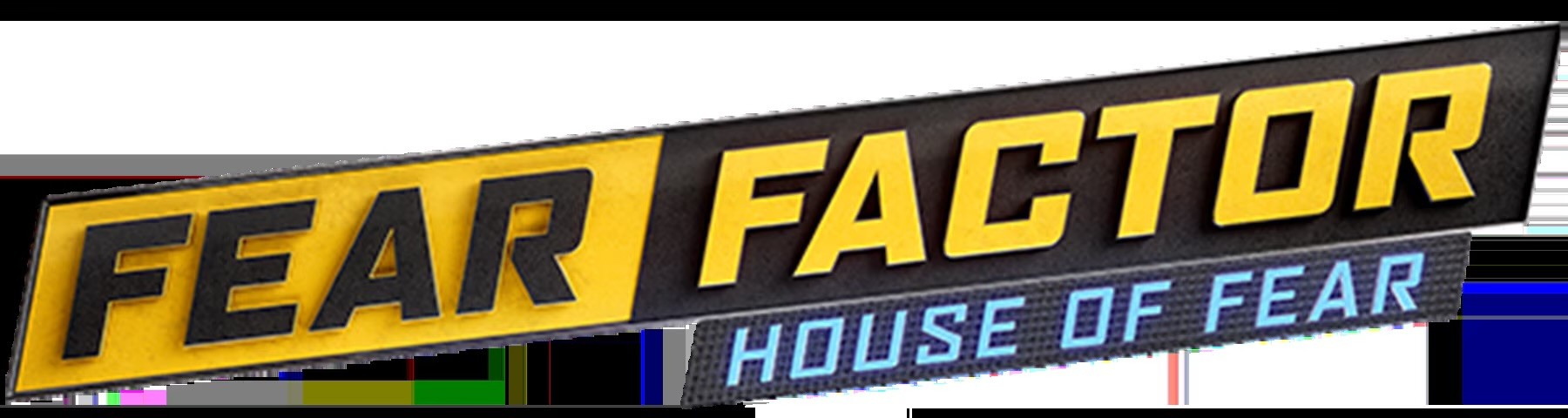
- Genre: Reality competition
- Directed by: Diccon Ramsay
- Presented by: Johnny Knoxville
- Country of origin: United States
- Original language: English
- No. of seasons: 1
- No. of episodes: 10 (+2 specials)

Production
- Executive producers: Anthony Carbone; Hannah Ganio; Michael Heyerman; Travis Johnson; Tomiko Jones; Sharon Levy; Sean Loughlin; Lindsay Tuggle; Kevin Hodder; Kevin Lee
- Producer: Johnny Knoxville
- Production location: Vancouver, British Columbia
- Cinematography: Kade Leslie
- Editor: Paul Claydon
- Camera setup: Multi-camera
- Running time: 44 minutes
- Production company: Endemol Shine North America

Original release
- Network: Fox
- Release: January 11, 2026 – present

Related
- Fear Factor

Fear Factor: House of Fear is a reality competition television series and spin-off of Fear Factor. It premiered January 11, 2026 on Fox and is hosted by Johnny Knoxville. The series format features a group of contestants living together in an isolated house as they compete in a variety of physical and mental challenges while navigating a strategic social game.

== Format ==
In addition to extreme stunts, this incarnation of the series incorporates a social element, in which contestants live in a house together in a remote location. In season 1, fourteen contestants lived in a large house, where a social game was implemented. They were taken to various locations to perform physical and/or mental challenges where the winner(s) were granted immunity from the Endgame (an elimination round in which one or more contestants are sent home if they do not pass the challenge). The finalists compete in one final daring stunt, where the winner receives the $200,000 grand prize.

The Season 1 finale was followed by a two-part, five-stunt special titled Fear Factor: 48 Hours of Fear. It contained elements of the sleep deprivation challenge from Season 4 of the original Fear Factor. It followed six new contestants who had to remain awake during the 48 hours of filming. All contestants wore shock collars, and if they closed their eyes or appeared to fall asleep, they were electrically shocked.

== History ==
On May 12, 2025, it was announced that Fox would be reviving Fear Factor under the working title Fear Factor: The Next Chapter, with Johnny Knoxville announced as the host the following month. The series was renamed Fear Factor: House of Fear in the announcement of its premiere date. It began airing on January 11, 2026. The house, (and respective challenges), were all shot in the Vancouver, Canada area.

Ethan Macmillan, a 20-year-old emergency dispatcher from East York, Toronto, won the first season in 2026.

In April 2026, House of Fear was renewed for a second season.

Following the season finale, Fox announced that Knoxville would host a two-part, five-stunt special event titled Fear Factor: 48 Hours of Fear, which aired on May 14 and May 21, 2026.

== Episodes ==
=== Series overview ===
| Season | Episodes | Originally released | |
| Season | Episodes | First released | Last released |
|---|---|---|---|
| 1 | 10 | January 11, 2026 | March 25, 2026 |
| Specials | 2 | May 14, 2026 | May 21, 2026 |

=== Season 1 (2026) ===
| No. | Title | Original release date | Prod. code |
|---|---|---|---|
| 1 | "Sealed Fates" | January 11, 2026 | FFA-101 |
| 2 | "Wrecking Ball" | January 21, 2026 | FFA-102 |
| 3 | "Stuck" | January 28, 2026 | FFA-103 |
| 4 | "The Main Drag" | February 4, 2026 | FFA-104 |
| 5 | "The Deep" | February 11, 2026 | FFA-105 |
| 6 | "Pain Auction" | February 25, 2026 | FFA-106 |
| 7 | "Walk the Plank" | March 4, 2026 | FFA-107 |
| 8 | "Human Claw" | March 11, 2026 | FFA-108 |
| 9 | "Short Circuit" | March 18, 2026 | FFA-109 |
| 10 | "The Final Endgame" | March 25, 2026 | FFA-110 |

=== Specials ===
| No. | Title | Original release date | Prod. code |
|---|---|---|---|
| 1 | "48 Hours of Fear - Part One" | May 14, 2026 | FFA-111 |
| 2 | "48 Hours of Fear - Part Two" | May 21, 2026 | FFA-112 |

== Players ==
=== Season 1 ===
| Contestant | Age | Hometown | Occupation | Challenges Won | Endgames Won | Ranking |
|---|---|---|---|---|---|---|
| Ethan McMillian | 20 | East York, Ontario | Emergency Dispatcher | 4 | 5 | Winner |
| Chelsea Montgomery | 34 | Oak Ridge, Tennessee | Spelling to Communicate Practitioner | 5 | 2 | Runner-up |
| Jayleen Carmona | 28 | Los Angeles, California | Marketing | 4 | 2 | 3rd/4th |
| Rob Rast | 35 | San Diego, California | E-Bike Business Owner | 4 | 3 | 3rd/4th |
| Daryl "Dida" Armstrong | 21 | St. Louis, Missouri | Soccer Player | 1 | 2 | 5th |
| Lance Richard | 31 | Opelousas, Louisiana | Flight Attendant | 3 | 2 | 6th |
| Danielle Stephens | 41 | Egg Harbor Township, New Jersey | Aerospace Engineer | 0 | 2 | 7th |
| Blake Hedrick | 36 | Orlando, Florida | AP Physics Teacher | 1 | 3 | 8th |
| Zach Nelson | 33 | Benton, Illinois | Coal Miner | 1 | 3 | 9th |
| Diana "Damienne" Flager | 30 | Lawrenceville, Georgia | Salon Owner | 1 | 0 | 10th |
| Rodney Rodriguez | 59 | Freeport, New York | Retired NYPD Police Officer | 0 | 2 | 11th |
| Tyler White | 34 | Sherrills Ford, North Carolina | Stay-At-Home Mom | 1 | 0 | 12th |
| Jennifer "Jeni" Brocious | 48 | Loveland, Colorado | Teacher's Aid | 0 | 0 | 13th |
| Kristen Downard | 29 | Tampa, Florida | School Counselor | 0 | 0 | 14th |

== Game progress ==
Progress of the players including competition and nomination history during each episode of the program.
| Players | 1 | 2 | 3 | 4 | 5 | 6 | 7 | 8 | 9 | 10 | |
| | 1 | 2 | 3 | 4 | 5 | 6 | 7 | 8 | 9 | Semi-final | Final |
|---|---|---|---|---|---|---|---|---|---|---|---|
| Challenge Winner(s) | Lance; Rob; Tyler; Zach | Ethan; Chelsea | Chelsea; Dida; Ethan; Jayleen; Lance | Damienne; Ethan | Blake; Chelsea; Jayleen; Lance; Rob | (None) | Chelsea; Jayleen | Rob | Jayleen; Rob | (None) | |
| Endgame Nominees | Ethan; Jayleen; Kristen; Rodney | Danielle; Jeni; Rob; Zach | Blake^{†} Rob; Rodney; Tyler | Blake; Dida^{†} Rodney; Zach | Damienne; Zach^{†} | All Players | Blake^{†} Ethan | Chelsea; Danielle; Lance | Dida; Ethan; Lance | (None) | |
| Ethan | Endgame | Immunity Winner | Immunity Winner | Immunity Winner | Safe | Endgame | Endgame | Safe | Endgame | Won | Winner |
| Chelsea | Safe | Immunity Winner | Immunity Winner | Safe | Immunity Winner | Endgame | Immunity Winner | Endgame | Safe | Won | Runner-up |
| Jayleen | Endgame | Safe | Immunity Winner | Safe | Immunity Winner | Endgame | Immunity Winner | Safe | Immunity Winner | Lost | Eliminated (Episode 10) |
| Rob | Immunity Winner | Endgame | Endgame | Safe | Immunity Winner | Endgame | Safe | Immunity Winner | Immunity Winner | Lost | Eliminated (Episode 10) |
| Dida | Safe | Safe | Immunity Winner | Endgame | Safe | Endgame | Safe | Safe | Endgame | Eliminated (Episode 9) | |
| Lance | Immunity Winner | Safe | Immunity Winner | Safe | Immunity Winner | Endgame | Safe | Endgame | Endgame | Eliminated (Episode 9) | |
| Danielle | Safe | Endgame | Safe | Safe | Safe | Endgame | Safe | Endgame | Eliminated (Episode 8) | | |
| Blake | Safe | Safe | Endgame | Endgame | Immunity Winner | Endgame | Endgame | Eliminated (Episode 7) | | | |
| Zach | Immunity Winner | Endgame | Safe | Endgame | Endgame | Endgame | Eliminated (Episode 6)^{N} | | | | |
| Damienne | Safe | Safe | Safe | Immunity Winner | Endgame | Eliminated (Episode 5) | | | | | |
| Rodney | Endgame | Safe | Endgame | Endgame | Eliminated (Episode 4) | | | | | | |
| Tyler | Immunity Winner | Safe | Endgame | Eliminated (Episode 3) | | | | | | | |
| Jeni | Safe | Endgame | Eliminated (Episode 2) | | | | | | | | |
| Kristen | Endgame | Eliminated (Episode 1) | | | | | | | | | |
| Eliminated | Kristen; Lost Endgame | Jeni; Lost Endgame | Tyler; Lost Endgame | Rodney; Lost Endgame | Damienne; Lost Endgame | Zach^{N} Lost Endgame | Blake; Lost Endgame | Danielle; Lost Endgame | Lance; Lost Endgame | Jayleen; Lost Semi-final Bracket | Chelsea; Lost Final Bracket |
| Eliminated | Kristen; Lost Endgame | Jeni; Lost Endgame | Tyler; Lost Endgame | Rodney; Lost Endgame | Damienne; Lost Endgame | Zach^{N} Lost Endgame | Blake; Lost Endgame | Danielle; Lost Endgame | Lance; Lost Endgame | Rob; Lost Semi-final Bracket | Chelsea; Lost Final Bracket |
| Eliminated | Kristen; Lost Endgame | Jeni; Lost Endgame | Tyler; Lost Endgame | Rodney; Lost Endgame | Damienne; Lost Endgame | Zach^{N} Lost Endgame | Blake; Lost Endgame | Danielle; Lost Endgame | Dida; Lost Endgame | Rob; Lost Semi-final Bracket | Chelsea; Lost Final Bracket |

Legend:

Winner
Runner-up
Won immunity from Endgame
Participated in Endgame
Lost semi-final bracket
Eliminated

^{N} Outcome revealed in next episode
^{†} Initial nominee under the "Drag Them to Hell" twist, where the challenge winners nominate one player, who then picks the other Endgame participant(s)
