= List of Fear Factor (American TV series) episodes =

Fear Factor is an American stunt/dare game show that pits contestants against one another in a series of extreme physical and mental challenges. The series originally aired on NBC for six seasons from 2001 to 2006 and then it was briefly revived for a seventh season in 2011–12. All seven seasons of the NBC series were hosted by Joe Rogan. A rebooted version of Fear Factor hosted by Ludacris aired for two seasons on MTV from 2017 to 2018.

The show's regular format featured six individual contestants (three men and three women) or four teams of two people competing in three extreme stunts for a grand prize of $50,000. The individual contestant format was the default for seasons 1–4, and season 5 contained a mix of individual and team episodes. The show permanently switched to the teams format in season 6, and this became the default format for the rest of the series, including the MTV reboot version.

== Series overview ==
Series	Season	Episodes		Originally released	
Series	Season	Episodes		First released	Last released
NBC series	1	9		June 11, 2001	September 5, 2001
NBC series	2	19		November 27, 2001	May 20, 2002
NBC series	3	27		September 23, 2002	May 12, 2003
NBC series	4	34		September 22, 2003	May 17, 2004
NBC series	5	31		August 30, 2004	May 23, 2005
NBC series	6	22		December 6, 2005	September 12, 2006
NBC series	7	9		December 12, 2011	July 16, 2012
NBC series	Specials	5		August 6, 2001	May 19, 2003
MTV series	1	13		May 30, 2017	September 19, 2017
MTV series	2	20	10	February 25, 2018	March 28, 2018
MTV series	2	20	10	July 17, 2018	August 21, 2018

== NBC episodes ==
=== Season 1 (2001) ===
No. overall	No. in season	Title	Directed by	Original release date	Prod. code
1	1	"Horse Drag; Rat Pit; Slippery-Car Crawl"	Randall Einhorn & Mark Perez	June 11, 2001	105
Contestants must hold onto a rope as horses drag them through the mud, lie in a pit full of rats, and collect flags from a wet car suspended in midair.
2	2	"Truck Jump; Worm Coffin; Catapult"	Randall Einhorn & Mark Perez	June 18, 2001	103
Contestants must jump from one speeding semi truck to another, lie covered in super worms, and shoot a paintball gun at their opponents while being catapulted over 100 feet into air.
3	3	"Jet Ski Leap; Beetle Bowl; Rope Crawl"	Randall Einhorn & Mark Perez	June 25, 2001	109
Contestants must climb from a jet-ski into a helicopter, eat live beetles, and crawl across a tightrope stretched between two building rooftops.
4	4	"Net Jump; Wormtinis; Tunnel Crawl"	Randall Einhorn & Mark Perez	July 2, 2001	106
Contestants must leap off a tower and grab a cargo net suspended in midair, eat live worms, and crawl through pitch-black drainage tunnel.
5	5	"Dog Attack; Snake Pit; Beam Walk"	Randall Einhorn & Mark Perez	July 9, 2001	102
Contestants must try to outrun a trained attack dog, lie covered in snakes, and cross a balance beam suspended in midair.
6	6	"Sub Dive; Cricket Crunch; Speed Drop"	Randall Einhorn & Mark Perez	July 16, 2001	107
Contestants must swim beneath a submarine and collect glow sticks; eat live crickets; and drop beanbags onto a target while racing down a zip line upside-down.
7	7	"Hotel Jump; Sheep's Eyes; Water Tank"	Randall Einhorn & Mark Perez	July 23, 2001	101
Contestants must drop from a 12th floor hotel window, eat sheep eyeballs, and hold their breath as long as possible while suspended upside-down underwater.
8	8	"Wrecking Ball; Testicles; Baby Rescue"	Randall Einhorn & Mark Perez	July 30, 2001	104
Contestants must swing down from a crane and smash through a wooden wall; eat buffalo testicles; and escape from a submerged car.
9	9	"Trapeze; Pig Feast; Traverse"	Randall Einhorn & Mark Perez	September 5, 2001	108
Contestants must leap off a telephone pole and grab a trapeze; open fortune cookies to determine which pig organ they must eat (liver, kidney, heart, ear, tongue, or snout); and scale a climbing wall on the side of a speeding semi truck.

=== Season 2 (2001–02) ===
No. overall	No. in season	Title	Original release date	Prod. code
10	1	"Bus Surfing; Torture Cell; Swinging Circle"	November 27, 2001	202
Celebrity contestants Donny Osmond, Kelly Preston, Joanie Laurer, David Hasselhoff, Coolio, and Brooke Burns compete for charity. The contestants must collect flags from atop a swerving bus; stick their heads in a box of super worms, millipedes, and scorpions; and walk the perimeter of tilted circular balance beam suspended over 100 feet in the air.
11	2	"Airplane Walk; Snake Face-off; Car Launch"	January 8, 2002	201
Contestants must walk on the wing of a bi-plane over 4,000 feet in the air; bob for plums in a tank of water snakes; and launch a car off the third floor of a parking garage.
12	3	"Bull Riding; Eat Brains; Zip Line"	January 14, 2002	206
Contestants must ride bulls, eat cow brains, and drop from a zip line into the ocean.
13	4	"Boat Jump; Swimming with the Fishes; Flag Snag"	January 21, 2002	208
Contestants must jump from one speedboat to another, retrieve weights from a tank of raw squid, and crawl on a horizontal flagpole jutting off the rooftop of a twenty story building.
14	5	"Helicopter Fire Drill; Eat Rectum; Ledge Walk"	January 28, 2002	205
Contestants must traverse the underside of a cargo net stretched between the skits of a helicopter as it hovers over a lake, eat pig rectum, and walk along a narrow ledge eleven stories high.
15	6	"Tight Rope; Hat of Flies; Escape Ice"	February 3, 2002	214
Playboy Playmates Lauren Hill, Angel Boris, Priscilla Taylor, Stacy Sanches, Julie Cialini, and Nicole Narain compete in this two-part, 90-minute Super Bowl halftime special. The contestants must walk a tightrope stretched between two buildings while holding onto overhanging ropes for support; eat hanging strawberries while their heads are trapped in a box of flies; and retrieve glow sticks from the bottom of a pool covered by a sheet of Plexiglas.
16	7	"Blimp Climb; Bobbing in Wax Worms; Car Flip"	February 4, 2002	207
Contestants must climb a rope ladder hanging beneath a blimp, bob for chicken feet in a box of waxworms, and flip a car off a pipe ramp.
17	8	"Helicopter Climb; Blender of Fear; Pole Hoper"	February 25, 2002	215
WWF contestants Jeff Hardy, Jacqueline Moore, Matt Hardy, Molly Holly, Lita, and Test compete for charity. Stunts include climbing a rope ladder hanging beneath a helicopter; drinking a protein shake consisting pig brains blended with various other disgusting foods; and transferring flags across a series of telephone poles high above the ground.
18	9	"Vertical Gauntlet; Rat Hat; Semi Truck Beam Walk"	March 4, 2002	210
Contestants must climb rope ladders and cross obstacle-covered beams as they make their way to the top of a 14-story building. They must also stick their heads in a box of rats, and walk a balance beam jutting off the top of a moving semi truck and leap onto the top of a second truck.
19	10	"Spiderman; Coffin; Water Cage"	March 11, 2002	218
Celebrity contestants Stephen Baldwin, Alison Sweeney, Alan Thicke, Kelly Packard, Ali Landry, and Kevin Richardson compete for charity in this 90-minute episode. Stunts include scaling the side of a building 36 stories high; lying covered in worms, snakes, and Madagascar hissing cockroaches; and escaping from a locked cage submerged in water.
20	11	"Bridge Hang; Uterus Skeeball; Cable Plate Walk"	March 18, 2002	212
In this 90-minute episode, contestants must hang from a trapeze bar on the edge of a high bridge, eat pig uterus, and cross a bridge made of cables and Plexiglas disks high above a hotel lobby.
21	12	"MTV Spring Break Edition"	March 22, 2002	TBA
Four contestants on Spring Break in Cancun compete for 50,000 pesos in this special half-hour episode that aired as part of MTV's Spring Break programming. Stunts include changing swimsuits in a jacuzzi full of dead squid, drinking a blended Fear Factor shake containing various unsavory food items, and bobbing for plums in a tank full of water snakes.
22	13	"Tunnel Swim; Eat Balut; Bike Plank"	March 25, 2002	203
Contestants must swim through an underwater tunnel, eat balut eggs, and ride a bike across a narrow beam between two building rooftops.
23	14	"Helicopter Jump; Tarantula Torture Cell; Water Tube"	April 8, 2002	209
Contestants must jump out of a helicopter and attempt to land on a pile of floating boxes, stick their heads in a box of tarantulas, and hold their breath while lying inside a horizontal tube filled with water.
24	15	"Public Nudity; Eat Roaches; Chain Submerge"	April 15, 2002	204
Contestants must stand naked in front of a live audience, eat Madagascar hissing cockroaches, and unchain themselves from a cement block while submerged in water.
25	16	"Sky Surfing; Fear Factor Billiards; Container Jump"	April 29, 2002	213
Sets of twins team up to collect flags from a seesaw platform suspended 100 feet in the air. The twins then compete individually as they play a game of billiards in an attempt to avoid eating live ants, habanero peppers, shiokara, and 100 year old eggs. In the final stunt, they must leap between shipping containers suspended 60 feet in the air.
26	17	"Roof to Roof Jump; Fear Factor Spaghetti; Submerged Fuselage"	May 6, 2002	211
Contestants must leap from rooftop to rooftop ten stories high, retrieve and eat balls coagulated blood hidden in a plate of worms, and escape from an airplane fuselage submerged in water.
27	18	"Jet Climb; Inverted Fall (Championship - Part 1)"	May 13, 2002	216
This seasons's thirteen non-celebrity winners return to compete for $100,000 and the title of Ultimate Fear Factor Champion. In this episode, the male contestants hang upside-down over 100 feet in the air and race head-to-head to release a flag from a locked box attached to their harnesses; the winner of each race drops head-first to the ground. Meanwhile, the female contestants must collect flags from a harrier jet suspended in midair as it rocks back and forth.
28	19	"Swim with Gators; Buffet; Tanker Truck (Championship - Part 2)"	May 20, 2002	217
In this 90-minute conclusion of the Fear Factor championship, the female contestants must swim with live alligators while the male contestants dine on a buffet of disgusting foods from past Fear Factor episodes. In the final stunt for $100,000, contestants must retrieve a key from inside a swerving tanker truck filled water, and then climb on top of the truck and insert the key into an ignition to sound a horn.

=== Season 3 (2002–03) ===
Although most episodes of the third season of Fear Factor were played in the regular format, this season introduced several special episode formats that would recur in subsequent seasons. Most notably, season 3 introduced the format of four duos competing as teams for the duration of the competition (as opposed to six individual contestants); this format was only used for one episode this season, but it would become more common in seasons 4 and 5 until finally becoming the show's default format in season 6. Other special formats introduced in season 3 included a four stunt show, all female contestants (in a non-celebrity episode), all gross stunts, Las Vegas Fear Factor, Miss USA Fear Factor, and a Christmas themed episode. This was the final season to conclude with a Tournament of Champions, which featured all of the season's non-celebrity winners returning to compete for a $100,000 grand prize.

No. overall	No. in season	Original title (top) Streaming title (bottom)	Directed by	Original release date	Prod. code
29	1	"Big Foot; Snake Tank; Floor Drop"	J. Rupert Thompson	September 23, 2002	303
Celebrity contestants Keshia Knight Pulliam, Barry Williams, Natasha Henstridge, Penn & Teller, Gena Lee Nolin, and Matt Cedeño compete for charity in this 90-minute episode. The contestants must try to start a car before it is crushed by a monster truck; retrieve pucks from a water tank full of snakes; and transfer as many flags as possible inside plexiglas box suspended in midair before the floor drops out from under them.
30	2	"Counter Balance Beam; Weenie Roast; Swinging Rope Bridge"	J. Rupert Thompson	September 30, 2002	302
Contestants must release flags from a see-saw platform suspended in midair, eat animal penises, and cross a series of swings hanging over 100 feet above the ground.
31	3	"Traverse the Dam; Bee Headed; Water Coffin"	J. Rupert Thompson	October 7, 2002	301
Contestants must cross a tightrope high above a dam; get covered with over 200,000 bees; and escape from a locked box submerged in water.
32	4	"Stage Coach Drag; Fish Dinner; Pipe to Pipe to Pipe"	J. Rupert Thompson	October 14, 2002	305
Contestants must climb up a cargo net being dragged behind a covered wagon; eat cod sperm, egg sacs, liver, or a combo plate of the three; and walk across slippery pipes suspended in midair.
33	5	"Speedboat to Helicopter Ladder; Worm Transfer; Car Thru Building"	J. Rupert Thompson	October 21, 2002	306
Contestants must climb up a rope ladder hanging beneath a helicopter, transfer worms by mouth, and crash a car through a building.
34	6	"Triple Beam Walk; Glass Walking; Magnetic Car Drop"	J. Rupert Thompson	October 28, 2002	304
Contestants must cross a series of balance beams suspended in midair, walk on broken glass with bare feet, and stand on the hood of a car suspended in midair before dropping the car onto a target.
35	7	"Burning Building; Scorpion Pit; Rotating Climbing Wall"	J. Rupert Thompson	November 5, 2002	307
In this 90-minute episode, contestants must rescue a dummy from a burning building, lie covered in scorpions, and outlast competitors on a climbing wall suspended in midair as the wall flips end over end.
36	8	"Helicopter Flag Snag; Slugs; Build-A-Bridge"	J. Rupert Thompson	November 11, 2002	312
Contestants must drop from a helicopter and swim to a raft; eat live slugs and drink cow bile; and cross a cable "bridge" between two rooftops using only three movable wooden slats.
37	9	"Dog Attack; Gas Chamber; Car Carrier Drive-Thru"	J. Rupert Thompson	November 18, 2002	308
Contestants must run through a maze guarded by attack dogs, outlast competitors in a room full of tear gas, and drive a car up into the back of a moving car carrier.
38	10	"Drowning Closet; Ostrich Egg; Merry-Go-Round"	J. Rupert Thompson	December 2, 2002	310
Contestants must escape from a vertical tube as it fills with water, drink a raw ostrich egg, and walk on a spinning balance beam structure suspended in midair.
39	11	"Scooter Plank; Deer Balls & 100 Year Old Egg Nog; Trapped Under Ice"	J. Rupert Thompson	December 9, 2002	311
In this Christmas-themed episode, contestants must ride a motorized scooter across a balance beam suspended in midair; eat reindeer testicles and drink 100-year-old egg nog; and retrieve a candy cane from the bottom of a pool covered with Plexiglas.
40	12	"Inverted Helicopter; Horse Rectum; Sky Walker"	J. Rupert Thompson	January 6, 2003	313
Contestants must free their ankles from shackles while hanging upside-down beneath a helicopter, eat horse rectum, and walk a large balance beam structure suspended in midair.
41	13	"Barrel Rolling; Rat Transfer; Car into Pond"	J. Rupert Thompson	January 13, 2003	314
Contestants must log roll a large pipe across a pair of beams between two rooftops; transfer dead rats by mouth; and escape from a car after launching the car into a swimming pool.
42	14	"Spin Cycle; Breakfast of Champions; Stilt Walking"	J. Rupert Thompson	January 20, 2003	315
Contestants must cross a set of spinning monkey bars; eat a Fear Factor breakfast consisting of balut eggs, liquified pig liver, and silkworm cocoons in brine; and cross a balance beam on stilts.
43	15	"Ferris Wheel; Fear Factor Pizza; Water Platform"	J. Rupert Thompson	January 27, 2003	317
In this blizzard-themed episode, contestants must run on top of a large wheel suspended in midair; eat a bile-based Fear Factor pizza topped with coagulated blood sauce, rotten cheese, red worms, and fish eyes; and unchain themselves from an underwater platform.
44	16	"Bobbing in Blood; Tomato Hornworms; Skunk Tunnel"	J. Rupert Thompson	February 3, 2003	318
In this all-gross episode, contestants must bob for plastic rings in a tank of cow blood, eat tomato hornworms, and collect dead skunks from a pitch-black drainage tunnel.
45	17	"Vertical Two Square; Electric Eels; Helicopter Rodeo"	J. Rupert Thompson	February 4, 2003	319
In this all-female episode, contestants must make their way around a spinning square-shaped balance beam structure suspended over water, transfer electric eels by hand, and hold onto a barrel as it swings beneath a helicopter.
46	18	"Save Your Spouse; Roach Transfer; Couples Hang"	J. Rupert Thompson	February 10, 2003	316
In this couples episode, one team member must rescue the other from an underwater box, couples must transfer Madagascar hissing cockroaches by mouth, and the men must hold onto the women while suspended upside-down in midair.
47	19	"Flatbed to Flatbed; Worm Coffin; Tumbler"	J. Rupert Thompson	February 17, 2003	320
Contestants must jump a car from one flatbed truck trailer to another, untie a rope while buried alive in worms, and navigate around large holes in a spinning tumbler suspended over water.
48	20	"Helicopter Boat Drag; Mechanical Bull Buffet; Window Washer"	J. Rupert Thompson	February 24, 2003	321
Contestants must climb up a rope beneath a helicopter; eat cow snout, spleen, and spinal cord; and balance on a narrow beam as it drops down the side of a building.
49	21	"Helicopter Slalom; Piercing; Maggoty Cheese; Flag Snag"	J. Rupert Thompson	March 3, 2003	309
In this 90-minute four-stunt episode, contestants must hang upside beneath a helicopter and collect flags as the helicopter flies over a line of flagpoles; have their arms pierced by needles; eat stinky cheese covered in maggots; and crawl on a horizontal flagpole 10 stories high.
50	22	"Las Vegas Show"	J. Rupert Thompson	March 10, 2003	323
50	22	"Phantom Swing; Slot Machine Eyeball Buffet; Luxor Slide; Blackjack Bet"	J. Rupert Thompson	March 10, 2003	323
Fear Factor travels to Las Vegas in this 90-minute episode. Contestants must swing on ropes high above the Fremont Street Experience; play a slot machine at the Mandalay Bay to determine how many fish, sheep, and cow eyeballs they must eat; and slide down the face of the pyramid-shaped Luxor Hotel. The winner must bet $25,000 of their winnings on a hand of blackjack.
51	23	"Miss USA Edition"	J. Rupert Thompson	March 24, 2003	327
51	23	"Inverted Water Hang; Fish Quicksand; Tanker Truck Surfing"	J. Rupert Thompson	March 24, 2003	327
Miss USA contestants must hold their breath while suspended upside-down underwater; eat fermented squid guts after retrieving them from a tank of fish scales; and balance on top of a swerving tanker truck.
52	24	"Go Cart Chicken; Fear Factor Basketball; Water Rotisserie"	J. Rupert Thompson	April 7, 2003	322
Contestants must race a go cart down a track suspended in midair without going off the end; drink blended worms and roaches; and unchain themselves from a rotisserie platform that repeatedly dunks them in water.
53	25	"Championship, Part I"	J. Rupert Thompson	April 28, 2003	324
53	25	"Dual Box Drop; Milk the Goat; Helicopter Box Escape"	J. Rupert Thompson	April 28, 2003	324
The Fear Factor Tournament of Champions kicks off as twelve of this season's 24 winners return to compete for a grand prize of $100,000. In this semifinal episode, contestants must race head-to-head to drop their opponents through the floor of a plexiglas box suspended in midair; milk a goat by mouth; and escape from a plexiglas box hanging beneath a helicopter. The two remaining contestants at the end of this episode will win a Mazda RX-8 sports car and advance to the finals.
54	26	"Championship, Part II"	J. Rupert Thompson	May 5, 2003	325
54	26	"Dual Helicopter; Pot Luck Dinner; Tank of Dead Mice; Pit Fall"	J. Rupert Thompson	May 5, 2003	325
The Fear Factor Tournament of Champions continues as twelve more winners from this season return to compete for $100,000. In this two-hour semifinal episode, contestants must drop from a helicopter and swim to a raft faster than their opponents; the men must eat disgusting food items from past Fear Factor episodes while the women must retrieve dead mice by mouth; and the final four contestants must retrieve flags from a wet platform full of holes as it pitches and rocks high above the ground. The two remaining contestants at the end of this episode will win a Mazda RX-8 and advance to the finals.
55	27	"Championship, Part III"	J. Rupert Thompson	May 12, 2003	326
55	27	"Submerged Hallway; Gross Items Transfer; Pipe Ramp Into Boxes"	J. Rupert Thompson	May 12, 2003	326
The final four contestants compete for the $100,000 grand prize and the title of Fear Factor Grand Champion. The finalists must swim through a tunnel submerged in frigid water; transfer worms, roaches, and dead rats by mouth; and flip a car off the roof of a three-story parking garage.

=== Season 4 (2003–04) ===
The fourth season of Fear Factor saw an increasing number of special episode formats, some of which had been introduced in the previous season (e.g., four stunt, all-female, Miss USA). Although six individual contestants remained the default format, the teams format introduced in season 3 was used in five self-contained season 4 episodes. This season included three extended competitions for increased grand prizes, most notably a seven-part Couples Fear Factor series in which nine couples competed in 17 stunts for various cash and prizes, including a grand prize of one million dollars. This was also the first season where some episodes included non-elimination stunts, in which the contestant or team with the best performance won a prize, and contestants were not eliminated if they refused to attempt or failed to complete the stunt. Unlike the previous two seasons, season 4 did not include a Tournament of Champions.

It was also around this time that Rogan would more openly and frequently comment about the absurdity of some of the stunts that the show was putting the contestants through. Rogan has stated on his podcast, years after the show finished airing, that he'd often comment on the preposterousness of the stunts to the contestants throughout the series' run. However, he also stated that these comments and conversations were often edited out of the show in the earlier years to give the show a harsher edge, which was intended to make the show appear more difficult.

In particular, Rogan was shown almost vomiting during some of the gross stunts, making offhand comments about the absurdity of several of the more dangerous physical stunts, and on the second four-stunt episode of this series, Rogan went as far as to say he 'knew' he wouldn't have been able to attempt the second stunt (which involved sucking out and then drinking the intestinal fluids of a cow), as it was too gross. Rogan, after struggling to maintain his composure while explaining the stunt (presumably realising its absurdity after seeing the run-through before the stunt was run with contestants), also revealed that while doubts about his own ability to complete some of the more outrageous stunts had occurred throughout the run of the show up to that point, this was the first time where he decisively stated that he wouldn't even attempt it. Indeed, Rogan appeared significantly more disturbed during the stunt than any other previous stunt in the show's run.

No. overall	No. in season	Original title (top) Streaming title (bottom)	Directed by	Original release date	Prod. code
56	1	"Extreme Monkey Bars; Ham and Eggs; Leech Coffin; Platform Swing; Swim With Chum; Quad Launch"	J. Rupert Thompson	September 22, 2003	407
Twelve contestants compete in six stunts for $1 Million in this two-hour episode. Contestants must cross monkey bars suspended beneath a helicopter; hold their breath in a tank full of leeches; bob for pig tongues in raw ostrich egg and then eat pig tongues and leeches; transfer flags on a swinging platform over 100 feet in the air; retrieve boots from a tank of rotten fish parts; and launch an ATV off a cliff.
57	2	"Fear Factor Las Vegas, Part 1"	J. Rupert Thompson	September 29, 2003	408
57	2	"Semi Circle Flag Snag; Feeding Frenzy W/ Piranahas; Roulette Spider Eating"	J. Rupert Thompson	September 29, 2003	408
Six contestants begin a six-stunt competition in Las Vegas for a chance to win up to $100,000. In this episode, contestants must crawl around a rounded pole jutting off the roof of the Mandalay Bay, and swim in a tank of piranhas as they retrieve pig kidneys by mouth from the bottom of the tank. Contestants then play roulette at the Excalibur for a chance to win a Mazda RX-8 sports car, but they must first eat African cave-dwelling spiders to earn roulette chips.
58	3	"Fear Factor Las Vegas, Part 2"	J. Rupert Thompson	October 6, 2003	409
58	3	"Taxi Cab to Taxi Cab; Roach Coffin; Crain Money Grab; Blackjack Bet"	J. Rupert Thompson	October 6, 2003	409
The Las Vegas competition continues as contestants attempt to jump the gap between two wet taxi cabs suspended in midair, and escape from a locked box of Madagascar hissing cockroaches at the Luxor. The winner is then given the opportunity to add to their $50,000 prize by grabbing flags representing cash amounts while being dunked head-first in the Mandalay Bay swimming pool; they must then bet half their winnings on a hand of blackjack. (The winner won $89,000 total, so they bet $44,500 on the hand of blackjack, they won the hand so they a total of $133,500)
59	4	"Heli Crawl and Flag Grab; Maggoty Madness; Head on Pipe Ramp"	J. Rupert Thompson	October 13, 2003	402
Contestants must release flags while hanging from helicopter skits; transfer maggots and horse hooves by mouth; and flip a car by driving it head-on into another car with a pipe-ramp attached.
60	5	"Heli Water Drag; Cow Eye Juice; Truck to Truck Transfer"	J. Rupert Thompson	October 20, 2003	403
Contestants must hold on to a tow rope as a helicopter drags them through a lake; use their mouths to pop cow eyeballs over a glass and then drink the juice; and jump back and forth between two giant dump trucks.
61	6	"Halloween Fear Factor"	J. Rupert Thompson	October 27, 2003	401
61	6	"Snake Tube; Goblets of Fire; Bobbing in Cow Eyes"	J. Rupert Thompson	October 27, 2003	401
In this all-gross Halloween episode, contestants must escape from handcuffs in tank full of snakes; eat live stink beetles; and bob for pig hearts in a vat of slime and cow eyeballs.
62	7	"Heli Dunk; Conveyor Belt; Human Hamster Wheel"	J. Rupert Thompson	November 3, 2003	405
In this all-female episode, contestants are hung upside-down beneath a helicopter and repeatedly dunked in a lake. The ladies must also transfer worms and animal organs by mouth, and run inside a narrow wheel suspended over water.
63	8	"Submerged Bus; Dirty Kitchen; Brain Surgery; Falling Beam Walk"	J. Rupert Thompson	November 4, 2003	418
In this 90-minute four stunt episode, contestants must rescue dummies from a submerged bus; retrieve cockroaches by mouth before drinking blended cow organs and rotten milk; retrieve plastic chips by mouth from a pile of cow brains and spinal fluid; and run across a series of balance beams between two rooftops before the beams collapse.
64	9	"Water Sack; Beetle Roach & Worm Transfer; Spinning Ledge"	J. Rupert Thompson	November 10, 2003	404
Contestants must escape from a body bag submerged in water; use their mouths to retrieve roaches and millipedes from a box of worms while hanging upside-down; and release flags from a spinning ledge suspended in midair.
65	10	"Truck to Helicopter; Table Clearing; Under the Semi"	J. Rupert Thompson	November 17, 2003	406
Contestants must climb up a rope ladder hanging beneath a helicopter; use their faces to search for combination lock codes buried in worms and blended animal organs; and drive a car under the trailer of a moving semi truck.
66	11	"Family Fear Factor"	J. Rupert Thompson	November 24, 2003	410
66	11	"Boat Raft Leap Frog; Family Tunnel; Worm Head; Suspended Water Tube"	J. Rupert Thompson	November 24, 2003	410
In this 90-minute four stunt episode, parent-child teams must jump between rafts being pulled behind a speedboat; transfer cow tongues through a tunnel of lard; the children must get covered in worms while their parents transfer the worms by mouth; and both team members must race through an obstacle course suspended over water.
67	12	"Boat to Boat Transfer; Worm Wine; Matrix Truck Straddle"	J. Rupert Thompson	December 1, 2003	420
Contestants must transfer flags by jumping back and forth between two speedboats; crush worms with their feet and drink the resulting juice; and walk through the narrow gap between two speeding semi trucks.
68	13	"Cable Surfing; Gift Exchange; Lake O' Fire"	J. Rupert Thompson	December 8, 2003	419
In this Christmas-themed episode, contestants must balance on a wet sled as it races down a zip line; eat the contents of mystery gift boxes containing either dragonflies, rotten squid, worm sausage, or cod egg sac; and swim underwater in a lake of fire.
69	14	"Fear Factor Twins (II)"	J. Rupert Thompson	January 5, 2004	421
69	14	"Dual Helicopter Box Drop; Bee Escape; Submerged Car Rescue"	J. Rupert Thompson	January 5, 2004	421
Teams of twins must jump from a helicopter onto piles of boxes; one twin is shackled and covered in bees, and their partner must dig through beehives to find the keys to the shackles; and both twins must escape from a car submerged in water.
70	15	"Couples Fear Factor (Part 1)"	J. Rupert Thompson	January 12, 2004	411
70	15	"Dune Buggy Drag; Bury Spouses Head; Heli Drop and Raft Pull"	J. Rupert Thompson	January 12, 2004	411
Nine couples begin a seven-week competition for various cash and prizes, including a grand prize of one million dollars. In this episode, couples are dragged behind dune buggies; one person must use their mouth to bury their partner's head in worms; and one person must drop from a helicopter and swim to a kayak, and their partner must then pull the kayak to shore. Two couples are eliminated.
71	16	"Couples Fear Factor (Part 2)"	J. Rupert Thompson	January 19, 2004	412
71	16	"Couples Chain Submerge; Sewer Transfer"	J. Rupert Thompson	January 19, 2004	412
The seven remaining couples must unchain themselves from an underwater platform, and bob for cow hearts in a trough of liquified animal organs. One couple is eliminated.
72	17	"Couples Fear Factor (Part 3)"	J. Rupert Thompson	January 19, 2004	413
72	17	"Spouse Spin; Fear Factor Pie"	J. Rupert Thompson	January 19, 2004	413
The six remaining couples are hung by their ankles at opposite ends of a spinning girder suspended over water, and they must hang onto each other for as long as possible. Then, couples must use their faces to retrieve coins from bile-based pies containing duck tongues, maggots, pig stomachs, and rotten fish before drinking a blended shake consisting of the same ingredients. One couple is eliminated.
73	18	"Couples Fear Factor (Part 4)"	J. Rupert Thompson	January 26, 2004	414
73	18	"Gross Dunk Tank; Heli Spouse Slalom"	J. Rupert Thompson	January 26, 2004	414
The five remaining couples must retrieve cow tails from a gross dunk tank containing cow organs. Also, couples must release flags from buoys while hanging upside-down beneath a helicopter; the couple that releases the most flags gets to steal a previously won prize from another couple.
74	19	"Couples Fear Factor (Part 5)"	J. Rupert Thompson	February 2, 2004	415
74	19	"Heli Spouse Rescue; Dumpster Dive"	J. Rupert Thompson	February 2, 2004	415
The couples competition continues as the women are locked in a cage beneath a helicopter, and the men must climb a rope to free them. Then, the men must dive into a flooded garbage dumpster to retrieve canisters of cow stomach and pig uterus, and the women must eat the contents of the canisters. One couple is eliminated.
75	20	"Couples Fear Factor (Part 6)"	J. Rupert Thompson	February 9, 2004	416
75	20	"Lean and Grab; Bobbing in Rats; Hog Tied Mate"	J. Rupert Thompson	February 9, 2004	416
The four remaining couples must cross a balance beam in midair, and the women must lean out and grab hanging flags while the men support them with a rope. Next, the women must lie covered in rats and chicken feet while the men transfer the chicken feet by mouth. Later, the women are shackled by their wrists and ankles above a pool, and the men must swim to the bottom of the pool and cut through the wires, dropping the women head-first into the water. One couple is eliminated.
76	21	"Couples Fear Factor (Part 7)"	J. Rupert Thompson	February 16, 2004	417
76	21	"Back Seat Driver; Save Your Spouse in Spiders; Heli Boat Jump and Plunge"	J. Rupert Thompson	February 16, 2004	417
The final three couples compete for the million dollar prize. One team member must help their blindfolded partner drive a car onto the trailer of a flatbed truck; the women are locked in a plexiglas box and covered in tarantulas, and the men must save them; and the women must jump off a speedboat while the men drop from a helicopter, and they both must swim to a raft.
77	22	"Helicopter Crawl and Rope Slide; Suspended Floor Drop; Intestine Chew, Milk and Chug; Mini Motorcycle Plank"	J. Rupert Thompson	February 17, 2004	422
In this 90-minute four stunt episode, contestants must release flags from a net stretched between a helicopter's skits before sliding down a rope and dropping into the water below. They must also transfer flags between platforms suspended in midair before the platforms drop out from under them; suck the fluid out of cow intestines before drinking it; and ride a motorized minibike across a high balance beam.
78	23	"Heli Flag Snag; Fondue Party; Eel Hang; Two Wheel Truck Ramp"	J. Rupert Thompson	February 23, 2004	423
In this 90-minute four stunt episode, contestants must crawl on a horizontal flagpole jutting out from a helicopter; bob in stinky fondue for rotten cheese and eat giant horse grasshoppers; retrieve car keys from a tank of moray eels for a chance to win a Mazdaspeed MX-5; and drive one side of a car up a flatbed truck trailer while keeping the other two wheels on the road. Among the contestants is a man hoping that a long lost love will see him on television and contact him.
79	24	"Tube Escape; Box of Reptiles; Hurricane Slide"	J. Rupert Thompson	March 1, 2004	426
In this all-female episode, contestants must escape through the bottom of a plastic tube submerged in water; transfer magnets while sitting in a box of snakes and lizards; and walk through an inclined plexiglas tunnel while being blasted with wind and rain.
80	25	"Siblings Fear Factor"	J. Rupert Thompson	March 8, 2004	424
80	25	"Tumbler Transfer; Grab and Grind; Tanker Truck Flag Build"	J. Rupert Thompson	March 8, 2004	424
Teams of siblings must navigate around large holes in spinning tumblers suspended over water; spit bugs into a meat grinder and then transfer the bug slop by mouth; and one sibling must retrieve a flag from inside a water-filled tanker while the other sibling crawls atop the truck plants the flag.
81	26	"Twirling Misery; Eat Live Snails; Car Jump out of Back of Semi"	J. Rupert Thompson	March 15, 2004	427
Contestants must wedge themselves inside a spinning box with no floor suspended in midair; eat live snails; and jump a car out the back of a moving semi truck.
82	27	"Extreme Building Plunge; Bug Windshield; Rotating Beam to Platform"	J. Rupert Thompson	March 22, 2004	430
Contestants must grab flags while dropping down the face of a 65-story building; collect mouthfuls of splattered bugs from a car windshield; and jump from stationary platforms to a rotating balance beam suspended over water.
83	28	"Tunnel Flag Snag; Potato Bug Bazooka; Tractor Car Roll"	J. Rupert Thompson	April 5, 2004	425
Contestants must stand atop a moving tanker truck and grab hanging flags as the truck drives through a tunnel; eat giant potato bugs; and start a car before a bulldozer pushes the car off a cliff.
84	29	"Miss USA Fear Factor (II)"	J. Rupert Thompson	April 12, 2004	429
84	29	"Murphy Bed Transfer; Fear Factor Miniature Golf; Heli Bar Hang"	J. Rupert Thompson	April 12, 2004	429
Miss USA contestants must transfer flags across a tilting platform suspended over water; eat sea cucumbers; and hang from a trapeze beneath a helicopter.
85	30	"Team Transfer; Hagfish Transfer; Cable Stand"	J. Rupert Thompson	April 19, 2004	434
In this Sleep Deprivation episode featuring five co-ed teams, the contestants are not allowed to sleep for the 48-hour duration of the competition. First, the men are hung upside-down from a trolly line and must carry the women as they transfer flags back and forth between two rooftops. Teams are also covered in slimy hagfish, and must balance on a cable suspended over water.
86	31	"Bound in Chains; Get the Gator; Heli Rope Transfer"	J. Rupert Thompson	April 26, 2004	428
In this all-female models episode, contestants must unchain themselves from a weighted vest while underwater; race through a swamp obstacle course that culminates in pulling an alligator out of a tunnel by its tail; and swing on ropes suspended beneath a helicopter.
87	32	"Dual Heli Beam Walk; Fly Shake; Hop the Train"	J. Rupert Thompson	May 3, 2004	432
In this Second Chance episode, six losing contestants from previous episodes are given another shot at winning $50,000. Contestants must cross a balance beam suspended between two helicopters; drink blended maggots and flies; and flip a car over a moving train.
88	33	"Underwater Tumbler; Bug Body Bag; Dual Heli Wall"	J. Rupert Thompson	May 10, 2004	433
In this all-female episode, contestants must escape from an underwater tumbler; free themselves from a body bag filled with bugs; and crawl across a horizontal rope hanging beneath a helicopter.
89	34	"Family Beam Walk; Family of Roaches; Kid-A-Pult"	J. Rupert Thompson	May 17, 2004	431
In this Family Fear Factor episode, parent-child teams must release flags hanging adjacent to a high balance beam; parents must transfer roaches by mouth to free their children from a box of roaches; and the parents must jump off a speedboat and activate a catapult chair that launches their children into the water.

=== Season 5 (2004–05) ===
The fifth season of Fear Factor continued to deviate from the show's original format, with the team format and competitions with four or more stunts becoming more prevalent. The show's introduction was revised to reflect this, stating, "Each show, contestants from around the country battle each other in extreme stunts" as opposed to "six contestants from around the country battle each other in three extreme stunts" as stated in previous seasons; the final line of the introduction was changed from "Six contestants, three stunts, one winner" to "Testing their fears, pushing their limits". Of the season's 31 episodes, 15 featured individual contestants, 9 followed the four team format, and 7 followed the extended Couples Fear Factor format established in season 4. In addition to a third-annual Las Vegas episode, this season included episodes filmed in New York City and Universal Orlando.

No. overall	No. in season	Original title (top) Streaming title (bottom)	Directed by	Original release date	Prod. code
90	1	"Couples Reunion" "Separating Platform Transfer; Underwater Cage Escape; Siphon Dump Transfer; Jet Ski Launch"	J. Rupert Thompson	August 30, 2004	510
The top five couples from season four's Couples Fear Factor series return for a rematch in this 90-minute, four-stunt episode. Couples must transfer flags between two platforms as the platforms slide further and further apart; escape from an underwater cage; transfer squid ink by mouth; and launch a jet-ski off the roof of a building.
91	2	"Favorite Winners" "Bike Plank Btw Box Trailers; Tomato Horn Worm Juice; Teeter Totter"	J. Rupert Thompson	September 6, 2004	504
Former Fear Factor winners return for another shot at $50,000. Contestants must ride a bike across a narrow plank between two speeding semi trucks; crush mouthfuls of tomato hornworms over a glass and drink the resulting juice; and walk across a see-saw suspended in midair.
92	3	"Couples" (II) "Underwater Limo Escape; Gross Blow Tube; Car Building Couples Rescue"	J. Rupert Thompson	September 13, 2004	501
In this couples episode, one team member must free their partner from the trunk of a submerged limousine. Couples must also transfer mouthfuls of blended fish, roaches, and beetles; and escape from a hanging car before dropping it down the side of a building.
93	4	"Jet Ski to Float Plane; Eel Helmet; Donkey Kong"	J. Rupert Thompson	September 20, 2004	505
Contestants must crawl on the pontoons of a floatplane over a thousand feet in the air; free their heads from a box of moray eels; and collect flags from a three-story balance beam structure by jumping from the beams to an elevator platform.
94	5	"Best Friends" "Underwater Safe Save; Tongue Bob and Transfer; Truck Car Ramp"	J. Rupert Thompson	September 27, 2004	503
Teams of best friends must complete an underwater box rescue; bob for cow tongues in lard and fish oil; and one team member must line a ramp car up with a flatbed truck while the other drives a sports car up the ramp and onto the truck bed.
95	6	"Babes, Bikinis and The Roadkill Café" "Heli Platform Escape; Road Kill Cafe; Norb Dizzy Platform Game"	J. Rupert Thompson	October 4, 2004	502
In this all-female episode, contestants must free themselves from a platform swinging beneath a helicopter; eat maggot-covered animal organ meat; and navigate a series of rotating balance beams suspended over water by jumping from beam to beam.
96	7	"Rolling Flag Snag; Sand Crab Panning; Suspended Car Rotisserie"	J. Rupert Thompson	October 11, 2004	511
Contestants must crawl on horizontal flagpoles jutting out from giant dump trucks; retrieve a box of live sand crabs from the ocean before eating the crabs; and release flags from a rolling car suspended over water.
97	8	"Water Paddle; Fear Factor Bar; Heli Surfing"	J. Rupert Thompson	October 18, 2004	507
Contestants must unchain themselves from a wheel that repeatedly dunks them in water; drink shots of blended bugs and fish eyes at a Fear Factor bar; and balance on a surfboard suspended beneath a helicopter.
98	9	"Halloween Fear Factor" (II) "Tesla Coil Beam; Witches Brew; Bug Tumbler"	J. Rupert Thompson	October 25, 2004	508
In this Halloween-themed episode, contestants must cross a beam while being zapped with electricity; eat a Fear Factor witches brew containing tarantulas, scorpions, and bug guts; and escape from a tumbler full of bugs.
99	10	"Siblings Fear Factor" (II) "Dual Heli Disc; Spider Head Game; Sinking Counter Balance"	J. Rupert Thompson	November 1, 2004	506
Teams of siblings must free themselves from a spinning platform beneath a helicopter, free their heads from a box of spiders, and release weighted disks from an underwater platform while shackled to the platform by their ankles.
100	11	"New York 100th Episode" "Tram Cargo Net Climb; Rat Stew; Suspended Heli Wall"	J. Rupert Thompson	November 8, 2004	509
Fear Factor travels to New York City for its 100th episode. Contestants must traverse a cargo net on the underside of the Roosevelt Island Tram, eat a blended rat in Times Square, and scale a wall suspended beneath two helicopters in front of the Statue of Liberty. The winner will get to draw from five pre-loaded credit cards ranging in value from $60,000 to $100,000.
101	12	"Models Fear Factor" "Extreme Heli Rings; Bug Ropes; Inverted Vacuum"	J. Rupert Thompson	November 15, 2004	513
Male and female models must swing around a circle of swing rings hanging beneath a helicopter; use their mouths to collect bugs from sticky ropes; and swim up into an above-water tube with 1500 gallons of water vacuum-packed inside.
102	13	"Thanksgiving Fear Factor" "Dingy Net Drag; Turkey Feast; Walk the Plank; Under Boat Flag Grab"	J. Rupert Thompson	November 22, 2004	514
In this two-hour, four-stunt Thanksgiving episode, contestants must climb up a cargo net being dragged behind a ship; eat disgusting Thanksgiving side dishes such as maggoty mashed potatoes and sheep brain pie; walk off a plank on the side of a ship and free themselves from a weighted ball while underwater; and swim underwater to collect flags from beneath a ship.
103	14	"Best Friends" (II) "Submerged Tubes; Blind Leech Wall; Suspended Log Rolling"	J. Rupert Thompson	November 29, 2004	512
Teams of best friends must swim through an underwater tunnel, transfer leeches to one another by mouth, and run on barrels suspended in midair.
104	15	"Christmas Fear Factor" (III) "Sinking Room Escape; Santa's Worst Nightmare; Pipe Ramp Roof Slide"	J. Rupert Thompson	December 6, 2004	515
In this Christmas-themed episode, contestants must retrieve flags from gift boxes in a submerged living room; transfer gifts across a room guarded by attack dogs; and flip a car into a group of plastic snowmen.
105	16	"Couples Fear Factor II (Part 1)" "Heli Couples Hang; Tuna Transfer"	J. Rupert Thompson	January 3, 2005	517
Eight couples begin a seven-week competition for various cash and prizes, including a grand prize of one million dollars. In this episode, the men must hold a rope while hanging upside-down under a helicopter, and the women must hang from the other end. Also, couples must transfer large tuna fish across a tank before eating fish organs or live snails. One couple is eliminated.
106	17	"Couples Fear Factor II (Part 2)" "Gross Catapult; Double Eat and Yank"	J. Rupert Thompson	January 10, 2005	518
The seven remaining couples must stand in a swamp, and the men must toss cow stomachs to the women. Then, couples must drink blended balut eggs before being yanked backwards off the top of a building. One couple is eliminated.
107	18	"Couples Fear Factor II (Part 3)" "Blind Driving Race to Truck; Double Tunnel Flush"	J. Rupert Thompson	January 17, 2005	519
The six remaining couples must drive a car onto the trailer of a flatbed truck while the driver is blindfolded and the passenger gives directions. Then, the women must rescue their partners from a tunnel that is repeatedly flushed with raw sewage. One couple is eliminated.
108	19	"Couples Fear Factor II (Part 4)" "Blockhead; Weighted Ski Boot"	J. Rupert Thompson	January 24, 2005	520
The five remaining couples must free their heads from boxes of snakes and tarantulas. Then, couples are dropped in water, and one partner must free the other from chains; the couple with the fastest time gets to steal a previously won prize from another couple.
109	20	"Couples Fear Factor II (Part 5)" "FF Triathlon; Electric Maze"	J. Rupert Thompson	January 31, 2005	521
The competition continues as couples compete in a swimming event that involves jumping off a truck and hanging from a helicopter. Then, couples must run through a jumble of electrified wires while handcuffed together. One couple is eliminated.
110	21	"Couples Fear Factor II (Part 6)" "Gross Gorge; Train Lean and Grab"	J. Rupert Thompson	February 7, 2005	522
The four remaining couples compete in an eating contest involving various bugs and animal innards. Then, couples cross balance beams atop a moving train, and the women must lean out and grab hanging flags while the men support them with a rope. One couple is eliminated.
111	22	"Couples Fear Factor II (Part 7)" "Bullfrog Coffin; Boat Heli Truck Car Jump"	J. Rupert Thompson	February 14, 2005	523
The final three couples compete for the million dollar prize. First, the men must free the women from a box of frogs before both partners drink a blended bullfrog. In the final stunt, couples must climb from a speedboat into a helicopter; the helicopter then lands on the roof of a moving semi truck, and the couples must climb inside the trailer and crash a car through the back of it.
112	23	"Las Vegas Teams" "Houdini Hang W/ Car Slide and Pyro; FF Cocktail Poker; Rope Traverse and Toss; Blackjack Bet"	J. Rupert Thompson	February 21, 2005	527
In this Las Vegas teams episode, one team member must drop to the ground head-first while the other flips a car off a flaming pipe ramp. Teams must also drink disgusting Fear Factor cocktails at the Excalibur for chance to win $25,000 in a game of poker, and toss balls to each other while crossing tightropes stretching between two wings of the Mandalay Bay forty stories above the Las Vegas Strip. The winning team must bet half their prize money on a hand of blackjack.
113	24	"Reality Stars" "Heli Rope Transfer; Gross Obstacle Course; Tumbler Cage; Up and Over Car Ramp"	J. Rupert Thompson	February 28, 2005	524
Reality TV stars compete in this two-hour, four-stunt episode. Contestants must crawl across a rope hanging between two helicopters; brave snakes and worms as they race through a gross obstacle course; escape from a spinning underwater cage; and drive over a moving ramp-car as many times as possible. The contestants are Omarosa from The Apprentice, Ethan Zohn and Jenna Morasca from Survivor, Nikki McKibbin from American Idol, Reichen Lehmkuhl from The Amazing Race, and Ryan Sutter from The Bachelorette. Ryan's wife Trista Rehn makes a special appearance.
114	25	"Fear Factor Twins" (III) "Helicopter Dual Drop; Cattle Trench; Yo-Yo Tank; Semi to Tanker Truck"	J. Rupert Thompson	March 7, 2005	526
In this 90-minute, four-stunt episode, teams of twins must complete a swimming event that involves dropping from a helicopter and jumping off a speedboat; grind and drink rotten meat after transferring it by mouth through a trench filled with cow innards; collect flags after being dropped head-first into a water tank; and one twin must rescue the other from a swerving tanker truck filled with water.
115	26	"Tarzan Semi to Semi; Fear Factor Donut Shop; Falling Beam Maze"	J. Rupert Thompson	March 28, 2005	516
Contestants must use a rope to swing off one semi truck and grab flags from the side of a second truck; drink curdled milk and eat donuts filled with worms, beetles, coagulated blood, or rotten squid; and cross a maze of collapsing beams suspended in midair.
116	27	"Miss USA Fear Factor" (III) "Water Beam; Triple Dump Tunnel; Cargo Net Box"	J. Rupert Thompson	April 11, 2005	529
Miss USA contestants must cross balance beams rigged with water jets; pull themselves through a tunnel as fish guts, oil, and worms are dumped on top of them; and scale the outside of a net cage suspended beneath a helicopter.
117	28	"Submerged Car Rotisserie; FF Sushi Bar; Wall Sweeper"	J. Rupert Thompson	April 25, 2005	525
Contestants must escape from a rotating car that repeatedly spins them through water; eat Fear Factor sushi rolls containing bugs, worms, rotten fish, and squid; and collect flags from a high balance beam before being pushed off the end of the beam by a moving wall.
118	29	"Best Friends" (III) "Shower Beam; Sausage Fest; Dual Pipe Ramp"	J. Rupert Thompson	May 2, 2005	530
Teams of best friends must cross balance beams in midair while being sprayed with water jets; eat sausages stuffed with bugs, worms, leeches, rotten fish, and bloody eyeballs; and teammates must race head-on toward each other and flip both of their cars.
119	30	"NY vs LA" "Heli Repel; Meat Locker; Mud Trough"	J. Rupert Thompson	May 9, 2005	531
Contestants representing New York and L.A. must rappel from a helicopter; dig through barrels of lard and a tunnel of ice to escape from a frozen meat locker; and grab flags as they are yanked through a chute of raw sewage and off the edge of a building.
120	31	"Newlyweds" "Dual Blade Wall and Heli Rope Climb; FF Wedding Toast; Couples Car Into Lagoon"	J. Rupert Thompson	May 23, 2005	528
Fear Factor travels to Universal Orlando, where newlywed couples compete in a swimming event that involves being dragged behind jet-skis and climbing ropes beneath a helicopter. Couples must also crush bugs and eyeballs with their mouths and drink the resulting juice, and escape from a car after launching it into a lagoon.

=== Season 6 (2005–06) ===
In its sixth season, Fear Factor abandoned the original format of six individual contestants competing for $50,000 and switched to a permanent format of four teams of two people competing for the grand prize. All episodes in Season 6 end with a Fear Factor Home Invasion: a short segment where host Joe Rogan travels to a home somewhere in America and challenges a family to compete in a stunt for a chance to win up to $5,000 worth of Capital One Visa prepaid credit cards. The introduction segment has been eliminated and instead opens up with Joe Rogan promoting his home invasion.

No. overall	No. in season	Original title (top) Streaming title (bottom)	Directed by	Original release date	Prod. code
121	1	"Heist Fear Factor"	J. Rupert Thompson	December 6, 2005	604
121	1	"Sikorsky Cargo Net; Tunnel Escape; Armored Car W/ Water"	J. Rupert Thompson	December 6, 2005	604
Teams must climb out of a helicopter flying 90 miles per hour and collect flags from a cargo net; and crawl through a tunnel containing rats, tarantulas, sewage, and fire. In the final stunt, the two remaining teams must "steal" up to $1 million in gold coins (worth $100 each) and gold bars (worth $12,500 each) from a submerged armored car in ten minutes, and the team that collects the most money's worth of gold wins the combined amount collected by both teams along with a trip to Universial Orlando Resort. (The winners ultimately won a total of $275,000). A family is challenged to retrieve keys from a box of snakes in the episode's Home Invasion.
122	2	"Blind Date Fear Factor"	J. Rupert Thompson	December 13, 2005	609
122	2	"Flying Boat Flag Snag; Crab Dump Escape; Dual Ice Box"	J. Rupert Thompson	December 13, 2005	609
In this 90-minute episode, single contestants must team up with a stranger for a chance to win $50,000. Teams must remove flags from the underside of a boat suspended beneath a helicopter; escape from a tank of cold water and large Dungeness crabs; and transfer pegs inside a box of ice before the floor drops out from under them. A family is challenged to transfer hagfish by mouth in this week's Home Invasion.
123	3	"Teams"	J. Rupert Thompson	December 27, 2005	612
123	3	"Crane Cannon Launch; Trash Can Scavenger Hunt; Heli Body Drag"	J. Rupert Thompson	December 27, 2005	612
Stunts include being blasted out of a cannon; retrieving items from barrels of oil, mud, lard, and rotten fish; and being dragged across pavement by a helicopter. A family is challenged to grind and drink worms in this week's Home Invasion.
124	4	"Psycho Fear Factor (Part 1)"	J. Rupert Thompson	January 3, 2006	605
124	4	"Buried Alive; Snake Water Escape"	J. Rupert Thompson	January 3, 2006	605
Six couples begin a six-stunt competition for $250,000 on the set of the movie Psycho. Between stunts, they must stay in the rundown Bates Motel. In this episode, the women are buried alive in a coffin with rats and worms, and the men must dig them up. Then, couples must escape from a water tank full of snakes. A family is challenged to bob for squid in a tank of squid ink in this week's Home Invasion.
125	5	"Psycho Fear Factor (Part 2)"	J. Rupert Thompson	January 10, 2006	606
125	5	"Psycho Shower Rescue; Hearse Slide"	J. Rupert Thompson	January 10, 2006	606
The couples competition continues as the men race to free the women from a shower that sprays blood. Then, the men must retrieve a flag from a semi truck while lying on a street luge being pulled by a hearse, and the women must climb on top of the hearse and plant the flag. Back at the Bates Motel, the remaining couples receive an unpleasant surprise. A family is challenged to eat slugs in this week's Home Invasion.
126	6	"Psycho Fear Factor (Part 3)"	J. Rupert Thompson	January 17, 2006	607
126	6	"Eat Camel Spiders; Exploding Room"	J. Rupert Thompson	January 17, 2006	607
The final three couples compete for $250,000. Couples must collect roaches from their hotel rooms; eat Iraqi camel spiders; and the men must assemble a detonator and blow the women out of the Psycho house in a massive explosion. A family is challenged to drink shots of blended worms, stinky cheese, and rotten milk in this week's Home Invasion.
127	7	"Teams #2"	J. Rupert Thompson	January 24, 2006	602
127	7	"Heli Platform to Platform Jump; Barber Shop; Container Launch"	J. Rupert Thompson	January 24, 2006	602
Teams must leap back and forth between tilting platforms hanging from helicopters; receive humiliating haircuts; and blow themselves out of a shipping container suspended in midair. A family is challenged to transfer stink beetles by mouth in this week's Home Invasion.
128	8	"Mothers & Sons"	J. Rupert Thompson	January 31, 2006	614
128	8	"Ledge Piggy Back; Mothers Kitchen; Under the Semi Sunroof Escape"	J. Rupert Thompson	January 31, 2006	614
Mother-son teams must scale a ledge as the mothers stand on their sons' shoulders; compete in a gross kitchen event involving snakes, scorpions, rotten milk, and hair-clogged sinks; and climb through the sunroof of a car into a semi truck trailer before scaling the side of the truck. A family is challenged to transfer blended worms and fish by mouth in this week's Home Invasion.
129	9	"Freaks Vs Geeks"	J. Rupert Thompson	February 7, 2006	618
129	9	"Chair Launch Heli Partner Pluck; Alligator Frog Box; Quad Off Pier"	J. Rupert Thompson	February 7, 2006	618
Teams of freaks and geeks must complete a swimming event that involves a catapult chair and lifting one's partner from the water while hanging upside-down from a helicopter; transfer tokens by mouth while sitting in a tank of frogs and alligators; and launch an ATV off a pier. A family is challenged to eat "roadkill stew" in this week's Home Invasion.
130	10	"Reality Stars (Part 1)"	J. Rupert Thompson	June 13, 2006	615
130	10	"Demolition Derby; Swamp Course"	J. Rupert Thompson	June 13, 2006	615
Five co-ed teams of reality TV stars begin a six-stunt competition for $150,000. The contestants include Jonny Fairplay and Twila Tanner from Survivor, Jonathan Baker and Victoria Fuller from The Amazing Race, Tana Goertz & Craig Williams from The Apprentice, Carmen Rasmusen and Anthony Fedorov from American Idol, and Mike "The Miz" Mizanin and Trishelle Cannatella from The Real World. In this episode, teams compete in a demolition derby, and then race through a swamp obstacle course that involves entering a tunnel with an alligator. A family is challenged to bob in lard for pig feet in this week's Home Invasion.
131	11	"Reality Stars (Part 2)"	J. Rupert Thompson	June 20, 2006	616
131	11	"Houseboat Rescue; Submerged Bug Box Escape"	J. Rupert Thompson	June 20, 2006	616
The competition continues as teams race to rescue a dummy from a burning houseboat. Then, the women are locked in an airtight box of bugs submerged in water, and the men must swim to the bottom of the tank and cut ropes to bring the box to the surface. A family is challenged to transfer scorpions by mouth and drink a scorpion shake in this week's Home Invasion.
132	12	"Reality Stars (Part 3)"	J. Rupert Thompson	June 27, 2006	617
132	12	"Spider Dive; Car Crane Collision"	J. Rupert Thompson	June 27, 2006	617
The final three teams compete for $150,000. First, the men must dig for canisters in a tank of ice while the women retrieve keys from a tunnel of tarantulas. Then, teammates must stand on hanging cars and toss balls to each other before the cars swing out from under them and collide in midair. Two families are challenged transfer rotten fish, squid, and cheese by mouth in this week's Home Invasion.
133	13	"Family Fear Factor (III)"	J. Rupert Thompson	July 11, 2006	608
133	13	"Lighthouse Zip Line and Heli; Stationary Electrical Fish Bike; Dr. Doom Partner Swing; Car Maze"	J. Rupert Thompson	July 11, 2006	608
Parent-child teams compete at Universal Orlando in this 90-minute, four-stunt episode. The parents must jump out of a helicopter while their children race down a zip line; pedal an electric shock bike that shoots dead fish at their children; stand on a narrow beam between the two towers of the Doctor Doom's Fearfall ride and swing their children out to grab hanging flags; and drive a van through an obstacle course while their children stand on top of the van and grab flags. A family is challenged to bob for rotten fish in this week's Home Invasion. Note: This episode was originally scheduled for a 90-minute time slot on February 7, 2006 before being pulled from the schedule. It eventually aired in an hour time slot; as a result, the episode was edited down to 60 minutes and the third stunt was omitted (a brief recap was shown in its place). The 90-minute version showing the third stunt in its entirety was later released on iTunes and Amazon Unboxed.
134	14	"Military Fear Factor"	J. Rupert Thompson	July 18, 2006	622
134	14	"Dual Reverse Heli Bungee; Military Crate Drop; Heli-Semi Plunge"	J. Rupert Thompson	July 18, 2006	622
Teams representing the Army, Navy, Air Force, and Marines compete in stunts on board the USS Hornet aircraft carrier. Stunts include being launched off the deck into a cargo net hanging from a helicopter; eating leeches, pig uterus, chicken feet, and rotten fish; and pulling grenades off the top of a van before it drives off the end of the aircraft carrier. A family is challenged to eat beetle and maggot sausages in this week's Home Invasion.
135	15	"Fire Fear Factor"	J. Rupert Thompson	July 25, 2006	601
135	15	"Fireboat Heli Net Climb; Fire Torch Toss and Drink; Fire Slide"	J. Rupert Thompson	July 25, 2006	601
Teams of best friends must climb a cargo net beneath a helicopter while their opponents spray them with fire hoses; drink blended habanero peppers; and slide down a flaming water slide before swimming under an ice platform. Firefighters are challenged to eat balut eggs in this week's Home Invasion.
136	16	"BK Viewers Choice"	J. Rupert Thompson	August 1, 2006	621
136	16	"Flying High; Junkyard Canine Attack; Vertical Bus Drop"	J. Rupert Thompson	August 1, 2006	621
This episode features four co-ed teams selected by the viewers through an online poll sponsored by Burger King. The teams must launch each other over a house and into a mud pit; run through a junkyard guarded by attack dogs; and climb out of a hanging bus before it drops to the ground and explodes. A family is challenged to drink blended maggots and cheese in this week's Home Invasion
137	17	"Young Vs. Old"	J. Rupert Thompson	August 8, 2006	610
137	17	"Tug of War; Roach Cage Escape; Barrels Off Truck"	J. Rupert Thompson	August 8, 2006	610
Middle-aged couples compete against couples in their twenties. Teams must try to pull their opponents off a building in a game of rooftop tug of war; the men must chew through intestines to rescue the women from a pit of roaches; and teams must a drive a car onto the trailer of a flatbed truck while the driver's hands are restrained and an opposing team throws obstacles at them from the top of the truck. A family is challenged to drink blended sour milk and stink beetles in this week's Home Invasion.
138	18	"Disaster Fear Factor"	J. Rupert Thompson	August 22, 2006	611
138	18	"Hurricane Ledge Walk; Roach Bob and Eat; Flood Crawl"	J. Rupert Thompson	August 22, 2006	611
In this disaster-themed episode, teams must scale a ledge while being blasted with wind and water; bob for cockroaches in glowing green sludge; and walk upstream in a flood channel against a raging torrent of water. A family is challenged to transfer stink beetles by mouth in this week's Home Invasion.
139	19	"Blind Date #2"	J. Rupert Thompson	August 29, 2006	620
139	19	"Body Weights; Picnic Basket; Train Drag"	J. Rupert Thompson	August 29, 2006	620
Single contestants must team up with a stranger of the opposite sex for a chance to win $50,000. First, one team member wearing weighted shackles is submerged in water with a 30-second air supply, and their partner must dive in and remove the weights. Teams must then dine on disgusting picnic items, such as maggoty fried chicken and rotten squid lemonade; and the men must collect flags while being dragged under a moving train and hand them off to the women, who must then climb atop the train and place the flags. A family is challenged to retrieve keys by mouth from a box of scorpions in this week's Home Invasion.
140	20	"Farm Fear Factor"	J. Rupert Thompson	September 5, 2006	603
140	20	"Pig Pen; Rotisserie Chicken in a Basket; Tractor Pull and Escape"	J. Rupert Thompson	September 5, 2006	603
In this farm-themed episode, teams must bob for pig tongues and transfer them through a pigsty; retrieve frozen chickens while strapped to a rotisserie that repeatedly dunks them in lard; and one teammate must escape from shackles while being dragged behind a tractor that sprays fertilizer and then free their partner from a tank of rotten milk. A family is challenged to eat tarantulas in this week's Home Invasion.
141	21	"Ex Factor"	J. Rupert Thompson	September 6, 2006	613
141	21	"Boat Lean and Grab; Scorpion Helmet Spin; Truck Switch"	J. Rupert Thompson	September 6, 2006	613
In this ex-couples episode, the women must lean off a balance beam atop a moving boat and grab hanging flags while their ex-boyfriends support them with a rope. Teams are then strapped vertically spinning wheel with their heads trapped inside plexiglas boxes, and they must collect scorpions from the ground and put them into the boxes. In the final stunt, teammates must back cars down ramps on the ends of flatbed truck trailers and drive up onto the opposite trailer from which they started. A family is challenged to eat Madagascar hissing cockroaches in this week's Home Invasion.
142	22	"Celebrity Fear Factor (IV)"	J. Rupert Thompson	September 12, 2006	619
142	22	"Dual Dunk; Isolation Barrel; Car Mine Field/Car Maze"	J. Rupert Thompson	September 12, 2006	619
Celebrity contestants Leif Garrett, John Melendez, Todd Bridges, Tempestt Bledsoe, Arianne Zucker, Brande Roderick, Traci Bingham, and G. Gordon Liddy must remove flags from their vests while being dunked head-first in water; outlast competitors in an isolation pod that delivers unpleasant surprises, including bugs and electric shocks; and race through a driving course where they will have to crash through an exploding shed. A family is challenged to transfer mouthfuls of stink beetles, super worms, stinky cheese, and rotten meat in this week's Home Invasion.

=== Season 7 (2011–12) ===
After five years off the air, NBC revived Fear Factor in 2011 for a seventh season consisting of eight episodes, two of which were two-hour episodes. This was Joe Rogan's final season as host, as well as the show's final season on NBC.

NBC pulled one of the episodes (titled "Hee Haw! Hee Haw!") from the schedule due to content concerns over the second stunt, in which contestants drank donkey semen and urine. The episode aired in Denmark in June 2012, and Fear Factor eventually posted short clips of all three stunts on their YouTube channel.

No. overall	No. in season	Title	Directed by	Original release date	Prod. code
143	1	"Scorpion Tales"	J. Rupert Thompson	December 12, 2011	1008
Teams of family members must collect flags from the bed of a remote-controlled pickup truck before a helicopter hoists them into the air and the truck crashes into a live ammo dump, creating a massive explosion. Teams must also eat live scorpions, and ride on the grill of a speeding concrete truck as it crashes through obstacles.
144	2	"Broken Hearts & Blood Baths"	J. Rupert Thompson	December 12, 2011	1005
Ex-couples must escape from a submerged car after driving it into a pool; retrieve cow hearts while handcuffed together in a tank of blood; and complete a swimming event that involves being lifted off the roof of a bus by a helicopter, jumping off a speedboat, and dropping flares on an exploding raft after climbing a cargo net hanging beneath a second helicopter.
145	3	"Tall Crappaccino"	J. Rupert Thompson	December 19, 2011	1006
Teams must collect flags from a car suspended between two helicopters; consume "crappaccinos" consisting of blended flies, stink beetles, tomato hornworms, and curdled milk; and one team member must drop through a multi-story tower of plywood platforms and saw through a rope, launching their teammate up through an identical tower.
146	4	"Snake Bite"	J. Rupert Thompson	January 2, 2012	1003
Couples must remove flags from suspended cargo nets after being catapulted off the roof of a building; one teammate must lie in a box of snakes while their partner transfers the snakes by mouth; and one teammate must use a jet ski to retrieve flags and hand them off to their partner, who is hanging upside-down beneath a helicopter.
147	5	"Roach Coach"	J. Rupert Thompson	January 9, 2012	1004
Contestants must rescue their teammates from a locked cage submerged in water; eat a meal from a Fear Factor food truck consisting of Madagascar hissing cockroaches, lubber grasshoppers, rat hair tortilla chips, and maggoty blood salsa; and transfer flags by leaping back and forth from a speeding car to a bus.
148	6	"The Bees Are So Angry"	J. Rupert Thompson	February 12, 2012	1001
In this two-hour episode, five teams compete in five stunts for a $100,000 prize. One team member must drop their partner from a helicopter onto a floating pile of boxes; one team member must stand covered with bees while their partner eats live bees; and one team member is yanked through a glass window 13 stories high while their partner scales a narrow ledge. Teams must also transfer bull testicles by mouth, and crash a car through the trailer of a moving semi truck.
149	7	"Leeches & Shaved Heads & Tear Gas, Oh My! (Part 1)"	J. Rupert Thompson	July 9, 2012	1002A
Five co-ed teams compete in five stunts for a $100,000 prize. In this episode, contestants are yanked off the edge of a cliff by a bungee cord attached to a helicopter. Then, the women must lie in a bathtub full of leeches, and the men must remove the leeches from their partners by mouth; both partners must then eat 10 leeches.
150	8	"Leeches & Shaved Heads & Tear Gas, Oh My! (Part 2)"	J. Rupert Thompson	July 16, 2012	1002B
The remaining teams continue to compete for the $100,000 prize. In this episode, contestants must climb a burning tower and blow their partners off the top in a massive explosion. Next, teams spin a "wheel of misfortune" to determine whether they must shave their heads, get a tattoo, or be tear gassed. In the final stunt, one team member must hang upside-down from a moving crane and pull flags off a car driven by their partner.
TBA	9	"Hee Haw! Hee Haw!"	TBD	unaired	1007
Teams of twins must collect flags from an electrified maze suspended over water, drink donkey semen and urine, and one twin must release flags on top of a moving train before the other twin flips a car through the train.

=== Specials (2001–03) ===
Special	Title	Directed by	Original release date
1	"First Season Highlights"	Randall Einhorn & Mark Perez	August 6, 2001
This clip show featured highlights from first-season stunts.
2	"Second Season Highlights"	Unknown	September 2, 2002
This clip show featured highlights from second-season stunts.
3	"Animal Moments Show"	J. Rupert Thompson	February 22, 2003
This 30-minute clip show had highlights from animal stunts featured in the first three seasons of Fear Factor. Clips included worms, rats, snakes, bulls, bees, attack dogs, alligators, Madagascar hissing cockroaches, and scorpions.
4	"The Making of Fear Factor"	Richard Plotkin	March 23, 2003
Access Hollywood reporter Tony Potts goes behind the scenes of making Season 3's Las Vegas episode, including how the stunts are tested, who thinks of those yummy treats, and how preparation of stunts happens.
5	"The 15 Most Outrageous Moments"	J. Rupert Thompson	May 19, 2003
Host Joe Rogan counts down the top 15 Fear Factor moments from the first three seasons in front of a live audience.

== MTV episodes ==
MTV's Fear Factor continued to follow the format of four teams competing in three challenges for a grand prize of $50,000, although MTV's format differed in some ways from the original format on NBC. This incarnation of the series was hosted by Ludacris.

=== Season 1 (2017) ===
No. overall	No. in season	Title	Directed by	Original release date	Prod. code
1	1	"Ice is Thicker than Water"	J. Rupert Thompson	May 30, 2017	102
Teams of siblings must lie in a bed and get covered with worms, millipedes, and cockroaches; one teammate must escape from chains inside a morgue drawer and rescue their sibling, who is trapped in a vacuum-sealed latex bag inside an adjacent drawer; and teams must escape from an underwater cage covered by a plastic panel with only three small air holes.
2	2	"Party Games"	J. Rupert Thompson	June 6, 2017	103
Couples contestants must transfer snakes by mouth from one water tank to another; play a game of “Fear Pong” in an attempt to make their opponents drink disgusting concoctions, such as MayoKraut and FishRanch; and drive a car up a ramp and onto the trailer of a flatbed truck while the driver is blindfolded and the passenger gives directions.
3	3	"Once Bitten, Twice Trapped"	J. Rupert Thompson	June 13, 2017	101
In this episode featuring teams of roommates, one teammate must lie shackled in a box of super worms, snakes, and scorpions while their partner reaches into boxes of the same creatures to retrieve the lock codes to free them. Other challenges include retrieving pieces of cheese from a table of mousetraps while blindfolded, and being dragged to the bottom of a pool by a 300-pound anchor.
4	4	"Computer Bugs"	J. Rupert Thompson	June 20, 2017	104
Teams of best friends must hold snakes, roaches, and scorpions in their mouths as they try to memorize computer passcodes; hold their breath while their heads (and personal cellphones) are trapped inside a box of water; and scale a moving car carrier before driving a car off the back of the carrier.
5	5	"Love is in the Air"	J. Rupert Thompson	June 27, 2017	105
Couples contestants must guess which live creatures (such as mice and roaches) are crawling on their faces while blindfolded; eat items such as surströmming and shrimp paste from a buffet of unsavory exotic foods; and crawl on horizontal poles jutting out from beneath a helicopter.
6	6	"The Struggle is Real"	J. Rupert Thompson	July 11, 2017	108
Teams of lifelong friends must retrieve items hidden amongst worms and rats while holding acid-shooting vinegaroons in their mouths; escape from a water tank covered by a grid of metal poles; and save their personal cell phones from a seesaw platform suspended in midair.
7	7	"Daters In the Dark"	J. Rupert Thompson	July 18, 2017	106
On-and-off couples must brave a dark room full of angry birds, endure an electric shock chair, and go couch surfing beneath a helicopter. Among the contestants is Taylor Ann Hasselhoff, who seeks to redeem her family name after her father's Fear Factor loss in 2001.
8	8	"Helicopter Parents"	J. Rupert Thompson	July 25, 2017	107
In this parent/child episode, the children must lie covered in scorpions while their parents transfer the scorpions using a neck cone. The teams must then conquer a leech obstacle course; and the parents must climb down a rope ladder beneath a helicopter and pull a rip cord, which causes their children to be yanked off the edge of a cliff by a bungee cord attached to the helicopter.
9	9	"Buried Alive"	J. Rupert Thompson	August 1, 2017	109
Teams of housemates must put their heads into a box of lizards, get buried alive, and collect flags from a hanging car before the car drops down the side of a cliff.
10	10	"Sister Act"	J. Rupert Thompson & Scott Farquharson	August 8, 2017	110
Teams of sisters must retrieve keys from cages of mystery creatures in the dark, swim in dumpsters full of trash and sludge, and release flags from towers of stacked barrels before speeding cars knock the towers out from under them.
11	11	"Ultimate Fear Workout"	J. Rupert Thompson & Scott Farquharson	August 15, 2017	111
Teams of fitness freaks must endure having roaches and crabs dumped on their faces; drink blended shakes consisting of unsavory food combinations, such as chipotle peppers, old sardines, and Alfredo sauce; and flip a car off a pipe ramp.
12	12	"The Old College Try"	J. Rupert Thompson & Scott Farquharson	August 22, 2017	112
Teams of college friends compete. Challenges include bobbing in rats, a laser beam maze that delivers electric shocks, and rescuing one's partner from the trunk of a submerged car.
13	13	"The Challenge vs. Shredders"	Scott Farquharson	September 19, 2017	113
Teams from The Challenge and Shredders must reach into tanks of snakes and electric eels, eat squid ink and fish sauce ice cream topped with various other disgusting foods, and one team member must lean off a high beam and grab flags while their partner supports them with a rope.

=== Season 2 (2018) ===
The second season of MTV's Fear Factor was divided into two halves, subtitled Season From Hell and Celebrity Fear Factor. The latter featured teams of celebrity contestants (or one celebrity contestant paired with a non-celebrity friend or relative) playing for charity.

No. overall	No. in season	Title	Directed by	Original release date	Prod. code
Season From Hell
14	1	"Get the Hell Out"	J. Rupert Thompson	February 25, 2018	204
Teams of best friends must search through blood and guts to escape a haunted house full of clowns, get buried alive in a coffin with rats and roaches, and escape from a cage that is repeatedly dunked in water by a helicopter.
15	2	"Tech-hell"	J. Rupert Thompson	March 4, 2018	201
Teams must search through boxes of bugs to stop their phones from being destroyed in a blender; repair a circuit breaker that delivers electric shocks; and drive a car while the driver is blindfolded and the passenger wears virtual reality goggles receiving a video feed from a camera mounted on the front of the car.
16	3	"Family Road Trip from Hell"	J. Rupert Thompson	March 11, 2018	202
Parent/child teams must search for items in a filthy house full of rats and tarantulas, retrieve items from a yard guarded by attack dogs, and scale the side of a moving camper.
17	4	"Hot as Hell"	J. Rupert Thompson	March 13, 2018	205
In this fire-themed episode, teams of twins must set their arms on fire, drink a spicy concoction containing habanero and ghost peppers, and climb underneath the burning trailer of a moving semi truck.
18	5	"Summer Vacation from Hell"	J. Rupert Thompson	March 14, 2018	203
Teams of college students must escape from a dark room full of alligators; run barefoot across Legos, mousetraps, and broken glass; and bungee drop from a helicopter.
19	6	"Blind Date from Hell"	J. Rupert Thompson	March 14, 2018	207
Single contestants must team up with a stranger for a chance to win $50,000. Teams must escape from an electrified cage, have the contents of their phones publicly exposed, and transfer flags across a see-saw platform balanced on the edge of a cliff.
20	7	"Exes from Hell"	J. Rupert Thompson	March 20, 2018	209
Teams of exes must work together to free themselves from an electric fence, eat marshmallows while their heads are trapped in a box of flies, and climb to the top of a giant corkscrew that their shoes are locked onto before the corkscrew is submerged in water.
21	8	"Hell and High Water"	J. Rupert Thompson	March 21, 2018	210
In this water-themed episode, teams must escape from shackles inside a tank as it fills with water, drink a disgusting cockroach soup, and one team member must rescue the other from a sinking airplane fuselage.
22	9	"Hell Week"	J. Rupert Thompson	March 28, 2018	208
Teams of college students from USC and UCLA compete. Challenges include removing superworms from one's partner by mouth; being strapped to a see-saw and dunked in ice-cold water; and climbing to the top of a multi-level tower of beams, nets, and girders dangling in midair.
23	10	"Party from Hell"	J. Rupert Thompson	March 28, 2018	206
Teams must retrieve items from a locker room filled with tear gas, drink disgusting concoctions of leftover party foods, and one team member must stand atop a speeding bus and grab hanging flags while their partner scales the side of the bus.
Celebrity Fear Factor
24	11	"Hip-Hop Battle"	J. Rupert Thompson	July 17, 2018	215
Teams must transfer animals including snakes, skunks, and giant crabs across a pen; search for items in a tank of ice as it fills with freezing cold water; and climb on large inflatable balls hanging beneath a helicopter. Contestants include Tyga, Lil Yachty, Kodie Shane, Chanel West Coast, and JBAN$2Turnt.
25	12	"Hip-Hop Sibling Smackdown"	J. Rupert Thompson	July 17, 2018	217
Teams must retrieve items by mouth from a tank of hagfish, navigate a room of tarantula-filled spider webs in total darkness, and release themselves from their harnesses while being dragged across pavement by a helicopter. Contestants include Swae Lee and Slim Jxmmi of Rae Sremmurd, and Ayleo and Meteo Bowles of Ayo & Teo.
26	13	"MTV Star Battle"	J. Rupert Thompson	July 24, 2018	220
Teams must retrieve items from a churning tank of chum and crabs, and collect hanging flags while crossing a balance beam and dodging swinging fireballs. In the final stunt, teammates are shackled and hung upside-down 20 feet above a pool, and they must free themselves while being blasted with fire hoses and drop into the water below. Contestants include Romeo Miller; Terrence J; and Tori Deal, Jordan Wiseley, Chris “CT” Tamburello, and Cara Maria Sorbello from The Challenge.
27	14	"Thrill Seeker Throwdown"	J. Rupert Thompson	July 24, 2018	219
Teams must pass items by mouth through a hole in a Plexiglas wall while snakes strike at their faces; chew tomato hornworms, cow eyeballs, dead tarantulas, and quail eggs over a glass and then drink the resulting juice; and remove flags from their vests while being repeatedly dunked head-first in water. Contestants include The Dolan Twins, Jake Miller, skateboarder Andy Roy, and Jackass stars Bam Margera and Chris Pontius.
28	15	"Reality TV Royal Rumble"	J. Rupert Thompson	July 31, 2018	211
Teams from Survivor and Big Brother must solve puzzles inside a small tunnel while snakes, superworms, cockroaches, crabs, and frogs are dumped on them; hold their breath while hanging upside-down in a tank of water; and climb from a helicopter into the trailer of a moving semi truck, set the timer for a bomb, and climb back into the helicopter before the trailer explodes. Contestants include Abi-Maria Gomes, Sierra Dawn Thomas, and Caleb Reynolds from Survivor; and Cody Calafiore, Zach Rance, Rachel Reilly, and Brendon Villegas from Big Brother.
29	16	"For the Love of Fear"	J. Rupert Thompson	July 31, 2018	212
Teams from The Bachelor and The Bachelorette must transfer snakes, scorpions, crabs, and rats using boxes worn around their waists; hit targets with a long stick to stop hot wax from raining down on them; and crash a car through a shed while wearing vision impairment goggles. Contestants include Rachel Lindsay, Bryan Abasolo, Vanessa Grimaldi, Danielle Maltby, Corinne Olympios, and Alexis Waters.
30	17	"Breaking the Internet"	J. Rupert Thompson	August 7, 2018	214
Teams of social media stars must free themselves from restraints in a water tank full of snakes; shoot crossbows at zombie statues in an attempt to avoid eating live cockroaches, tarantulas, scorpions, and cave-dwelling spiders; and swing off of a crane jutting over the edge of a 350-foot cliff. Contestants include Tyler Oakley, Korey Kuhl, JC Caylen, Dominic DeAngelis, Lia Shelesh, and Instagram stars TiTi and LaLa.
31	18	"Battle of the Bands"	J. Rupert Thompson	August 7, 2018	218
Members of the band MisterWives pair up and compete against one another. Teams must smash musical instruments and retrieve puzzle pieces hidden inside before a woodchipper destroys their personal cellphones. Subsequent challenges include being shot by a taser gun, and driving a dual go-kart being pulled by a helicopter.
32	19	"Music Star Showdown"	J. Rupert Thompson	August 14, 2018	213
Teams must wrangle ostriches, escape from a box covered by a rebar grid before the box fills with cement, and drive an ATV off a cliff. Contestants include Cal Shapiro and Rob Resnick of Timeflies, Bea Miller, and Drake Bell.
33	20	"The Shoredown"	J. Rupert Thompson	August 21, 2018	216
Teams from Jersey Shore and Floribama Shore must transfer scorpions, cave-dwelling spiders, crabs, millipedes, tomato hornworms, and dead squid by mouth; put their heads into glass bowls and hold their breath as the bowls fill with sand; and complete a water rescue that involves rappelling from a helicopter and jumping off a moving speedboat. Contestants include Snooki, Pauly D, Ronnie Ortiz-Magro, and Deena Nicole Cortese from Jersey Shore; and Nilsa Prowant, Jeremiah Buoni, Kirk Medas and Aimee Hall from Floribama Shore.
