= Rolex (song) =

2017 single by Ayo & Teo

Single by Ayo & Teo
- Released: March 15, 2017
- Genre: Trap
- Length: 4:00
- Label: Columbia; Zone 4
- Songwriters: Phalon Alexander; Jamal Jones; Jeremy Miller; Tariq Sharrieff; Ayleo Bowles; Mateo Bowles
- Producers: BLSSD; Backpack

Music video
- "Rolex" on YouTube

"Rolex" is a song by American rap/dance duo Ayo & Teo, released on March 15, 2017. The song peaked at #20 on the US Billboard Hot 100 during the week of June 17, 2017. It was produced by BLSD and Backpack.

== Music video ==
The audio of "Rolex" was uploaded on Ayo & Teo's YouTube account on January 13, 2017. The music video was uploaded on their VEVO account on May 26, 2017. The video has received over 1 billion views as of October 2023 and features Usher. The audio has also received over 134 million views.

== Fortnite ==
An emote in the video game Fortnite is based on the song; the emote is named "Rollie" and makes a player's character dance with the choreography from the music video.

== Charts ==
=== Weekly charts ===
Chart (2017)	Peak position
Canada (Canadian Hot 100)	33
Philippines (Philippine Hot 100)	15
US Billboard Hot 100	20
US Hot R&B/Hip-Hop Songs (Billboard)	10
US Rhythmic Airplay (Billboard)	18

=== Year-end charts ===
Chart (2017)	Position
Canada (Canadian Hot 100)	89
US Billboard Hot 100	61
US Hot R&B/Hip-Hop Songs (Billboard)	28

== Certifications ==
Region	Certification	Certified units/sales
Canada (Music Canada)	2× Platinum	160,000^{‡}
Denmark (IFPI Danmark)	Gold	45,000^{‡}
France (SNEP)	Gold	66,666^{‡}
Italy (FIMI)	Gold	25,000^{‡}
New Zealand (RMNZ)	Platinum	30,000^{‡}
Poland (ZPAV)	Gold	25,000^{‡}
United Kingdom (BPI)	Gold	400,000^{‡}
United States (RIAA)	2× Platinum	2,000,000^{‡}
^{‡} Sales+streaming figures based on certification alone.

== See also ==
- List of one-hit wonders in the United States
