= Therése Lindgren =

Swedish vlogger, entrepreneur

- Born: Therése Jessica Lindgren; Nynäshamn, Sweden
- Occupations: Vlogger; social influencer; businesswoman
- Years active: 2013–present

YouTube information
- Channel: Therese Lindgren
- Years active: 2013–2023
- Genres: Vlog; Beauty; Lifestyle
- Subscribers: 1 million
- Views: 513 million
- Last updated: 22 October 2025

Therése Jessica Lindgren is a Swedish vlogger and YouTuber. She is a board member of Independent Beauty Sweden AB, Lindgren Group AB and ThereseLindgren AB. She is also a deputy board member of Weasel Wave AB.

== Early life ==
Lindgren was born in a small rural town near Nynäshamn and grew up in Nynäshamn. She attended the social sciences program in high school. She studied experiential knowledge in Nyköping. During her youth, she worked as a receptionist, cloakroom attendant and waitress. When she worked as a media saleswoman, she was twice on sick leave for mental illness. During the second period, Lindgren only managed to read blogs about beauty care and make-up which she ended up putting on her own vlog posting on YouTube.

== YouTube career ==
She started her YouTube channel in 2013, where she vlogs on beauty and health, along with videos about her everyday life, her panic disorder and her commitment to animal rights. She uploaded her last video on her channel in November 2023.

== Selected bibliography ==
- Lindgren, Therése (2016) Ibland mår jag inte så bra (Sometimes I do not feel well) Stockholm: Bokförlaget Forum
- Mitt bästa år : En bullet journal för att må bättre (2020) Stockholm : Bokförlaget Forum
