= Ayo & Teo =

American rap and dance duo

- Origin: Ann Arbor, Michigan, United States
- Genres: Hip hop; trap; cloud rap
- Occupations: Dancers; choreographers; rappers
- Years active: 2011–present
- Labels: Columbia (former); Zone 4 (former); Sho'Nuff Digital; BMG
- Members: Ayleo Bowles (Ayo); Mateo Bowles (Teo)

Ayleo Bowles and Mateo Bowles, better known as Ayo & Teo, are an American rap and dance brother duo from Ann Arbor, Michigan, that started in 2011. They are best known for their 2017 viral hit single "Rolex", which peaked at number 20 on the US Billboard Hot 100. They appeared in the music videos for Usher's "No Limit" and Chris Brown's "Party".

== Early life ==
Ayleo Bowles (Ayo) and Mateo Bowles (Teo) were born in Ann Arbor, Michigan. They both attended Ypsilanti Community High School.

The duo taught themselves how to dance from watching other artists like Usher, Kida, Skitzo, and Madd Chadd, with their greatest influences being the French dance duo Les Twins and movies like Breakin' and Step Up.

== Rise to fame ==
They made their YouTube channel on November 14, 2011 and made a video in 2016. The duo started out by posting dance videos on social media. They rose to fame with their 2017 single "Rolex", which charted onto the Billboard Hot 100 at number 20. The song went viral, and the brothers moved to Atlanta to pursue to their music career. They signed to Columbia Records in 2017.

They have performed at the 2016 BET Awards and have had several music video appearances, with artists like Usher, Chris Brown, Lil Yachty, and others. The duo are known for their use of masks in their outfits.

== Discography ==
=== Studio albums ===
| Title | Details |
|---|---|
| Power | Released: 2021; Format: Digital download, streaming |

=== Extended plays ===
| Title | Details |
|---|---|
| Bring a Friend | Released: 2020; Format: Digital download, streaming |

=== Singles ===
List of singles, with selected chart positions, and showing year released
| Title | Year | Peak chart positions | | | | | Certifications | Album |
| Title | Year | US | CAN | US R&B | US Rap | PHI | Certifications | Album |
|---|---|---|---|---|---|---|---|---|
| "In Reverse" | 2016 | — | — | — | — | — | | —N/a |
| "Lit Right Now" | 2017 | — | — | — | — | — | | —N/a |
| "Rolex" | 2017 | 20 | 33 | 7 | 33 | 15 | RIAA: 2× Platinum; MC: 2× Platinum | —N/a |
| "Better Off Alone" | 2017 | — | — | — | — | — | | —N/a |
| "Like Us" | 2017 | — | — | — | — | — | | —N/a |
| "Hold My Sauce" | 2018 | — | — | — | — | — | | —N/a |
| "AY3" (featuring Lil Yachty) | 2018 | — | — | — | — | — | | —N/a |
| "Fallen Angels" | 2018 | — | — | — | — | — | | —N/a |
| "Friends" (featuring B Smyth) | 2019 | — | — | — | — | — | | —N/a |
| "Last Forever" | 2019 | — | — | — | — | — | | —N/a |
| "Fly n Ghetto " | 2019 | — | — | — | — | — | | —N/a |
| "Around The World" | 2020 | — | — | — | — | — | | —N/a |
| "Up To Sum" | 2020 | — | — | — | — | — | | —N/a |
| "Goin'" | 2021 | — | — | — | — | — | | —N/a |
| "Stop Drop Roll" | 2021 | — | — | — | — | — | | —N/a |
| "Different'" | 2022 | — | — | — | — | — | | —N/a |
| "Mumbai Freestyle" | 2022 | — | — | — | — | — | | —N/a |

== See also ==
- List of dancers
