= List of Kendrick Lamar live performances =

American rapper performances

Kendrick Lamar live performances
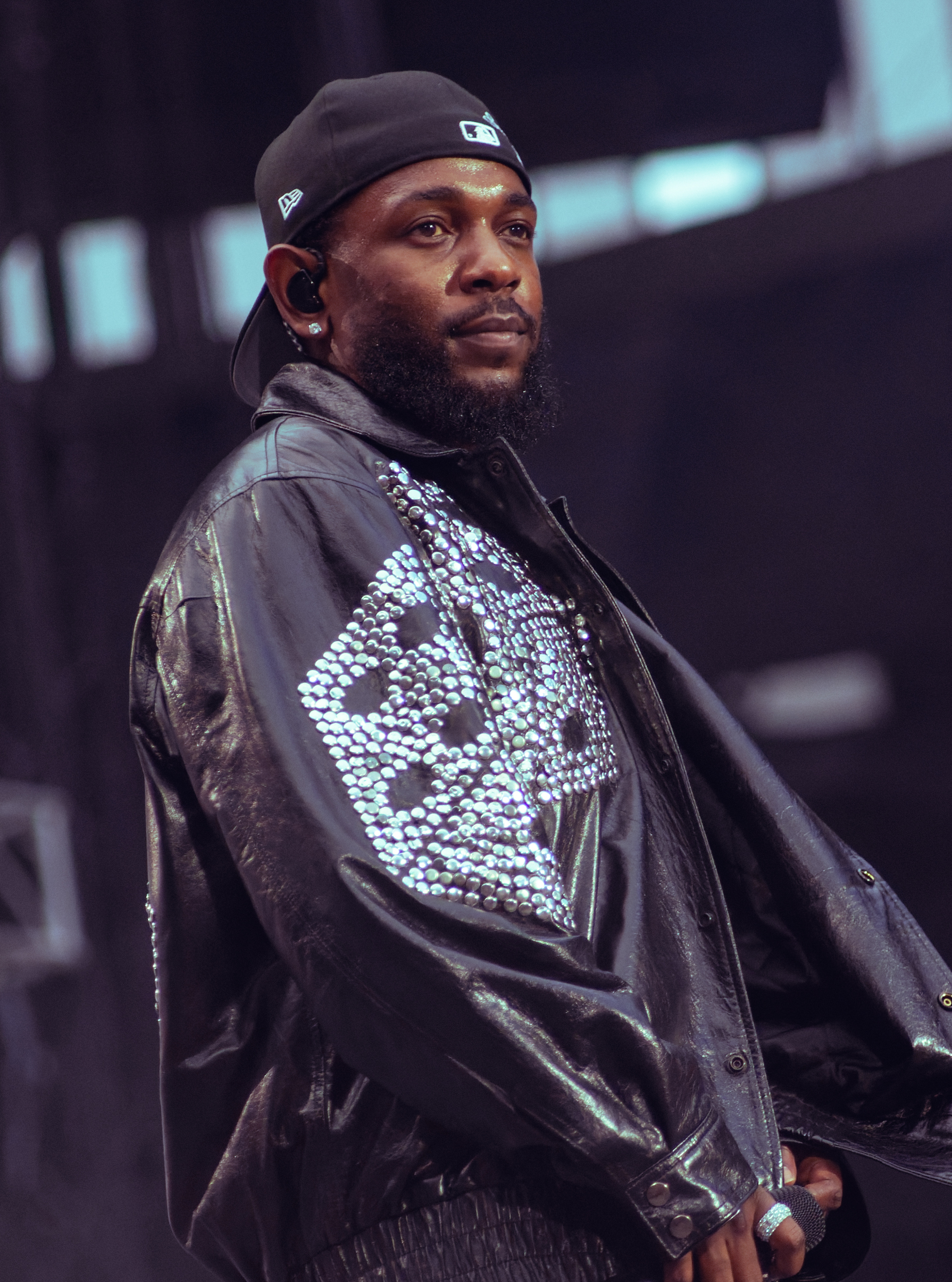
- Lamar at the Grand National Tour (2025)
- Concert tours: 5
- One-off concerts: 10
- Benefit concerts: 5
- Music festivals: 158
- Award shows: 13
- Television shows and specials: 12

American rapper Kendrick Lamar has headlined five concert tours and nine one-off concerts, and performed in 157 music festivals. After touring with The Game and Tech N9ne as a hype man for Jay Rock, Lamar traveled to venues and college campuses across the US to promote his debut studio album, Section.80 (2011). Throughout 2012, he served as a supporting act for Drake, Wiz Khalifa, and Mac Miller. Lamar's first concert tour, the Good Kid, M.A.A.D City Tour (2013), visited North America and Europe, and grossed over $1.5 million from 23 headlining shows. Following the tour's conclusion, he opened for Kanye West and Eminem.

Kunta's Groove Sessions (2015), Lamar's second concert tour, visited select small-capacity venues across the US. His stage presence and intimate experience was praised by contemporary music critics. Lamar's Damn Tour (2017–2018) was his first to primarily visit arenas, and visited North America, Europe, and Oceania. Applauded by critics for its incorporation of kung fu imagery, the tour grossed over $77 million from 64 shows. While embarking on the Damn Tour, Lamar co-headlined the Championship Tour (2018) alongside artists from Top Dawg Entertainment. After they concluded, he performed at various festivals before taking a two-year hiatus from touring. In 2021, Lamar returned to the stage with his critically acclaimed headlining performance at Day N Vegas. The following year, he embarked on the Big Steppers Tour, his first solo concert tour in over four years. It was met with rave reviews from critics, who lauded the tour's minimalist aesthetic and Lamar's performance. Earning over $110 million from 76 shows across Europe, North America, and Oceania, the Big Steppers Tour is the second highest-grossing rap tour of all time.

Outside of concert tours, Lamar has performed at various television programs, award shows, and benefit concerts like the Global Citizen Festival (2016). He headlined the Super Bowl LVI halftime show in 2022 alongside Dr. Dre, Snoop Dogg, Eminem, and Mary J. Blige, the first of its kind to be centered around hip hop music. In 2025, he headlined the Super Bowl LIX halftime show featuring SZA. Lamar's performances at the Grammy Awards and Saturday Night Live have been hailed by critics as some of the greatest live performances in television history.

== Tours ==
=== Headlining ===
Title	Dates	Associated album(s)	Continent(s)	Shows	Gross	Attendance	Ref.
Good Kid, M.A.A.D City Tour	May 5, 2013 – August 24, 2013	Good Kid, M.A.A.D City	North America; Europe	60	$1,946,145	64,101	
Kunta's Groove Sessions	October 20, 2015 – November 10, 2015	To Pimp a Butterfly	North America	13	—N/a	—N/a	
The Damn Tour	July 7, 2017 – July 30, 2018	Damn	North America; Europe; Oceania; Asia	64	$77,311,601	833,372	
The Big Steppers Tour	June 23, 2022 – March 23, 2024	Mr. Morale & the Big Steppers	Europe; North America; South America; Oceania; Asia; Africa	101	$110,886,026	929,056	

=== Co-headlining ===
Title	Co-headliner(s)	Date	Associated album(s)	Continent(s)	Shows	Gross	Attendance	Ref.
The Championship Tour	Top Dawg Entertainment artists	May 4, 2018 – June 16, 2018	Various	North America	30	—N/a	—N/a	
Grand National Tour	SZA	April 19, 2025 – December 10, 2025	GNX, Lana	North America; Europe; South America; Oceania	39	—N/a	—N/a	

=== Promotional ===
Title	Dates	Associated album(s)	Continent(s)	Shows	Gross	Attendance	Ref.
BET Music Matters Tour	September 7, 2012 – October 8, 2012	Section.80	North America	23	—N/a	—N/a	
The Verge Campus Tour (with Steve Aoki)	April 9, 2013 – April 30, 2013	Various	North America	24	—N/a	—N/a	

=== Supporting ===
Title	Headliner(s)	Date	Associated album(s)	Continent(s)	Shows	Ref.
Club Paradise Tour	Drake	February 14, 2012 – April 25, 2012	Take Care	North America; Europe	38	
Under the Influence of Music Tour	Wiz Khalifa; Mac Miller	July 26, 2012 – August 5, 2012	Various	North America	9	
The Yeezus Tour	Kanye West	October 19, 2013 – December 23, 2013	Yeezus	North America	25	
Rapture Tour	Eminem	February 15, 2014 – July 12, 2014	The Marshall Mathers LP 2	Oceania; Africa; Europe	8	

== One-off concerts ==
Title	Date	Event	Venue	City	Country	Performed song(s)	Ref.
Kendrick Lamar with the NSO Pops	October 20, 2015	—N/a	John F. Kennedy Center for the Performing Arts	Washington, D.C.	United States	"For Free? (Interlude)"; "Wesley's Theory"; "Institutionalized"; "Backseat Freestyle"; "These Walls"; "For Sale? (Interlude)"; "Hood Politics"; "Complexion (A Zulu Love)"; "M.A.A.D City" (first verse); "U"; "King Kunta"; "I"; "How Much a Dollar Cost"; "The Blacker the Berry"; "Mortal Man"; "Alright"	
AMEX Music Meets Art: Kendrick Lamar featuring Shantell Martin	December 1, 2016	Art Basel	Faena Art Dome	Miami Beach	United States	"Untitled 07 – 2014–2016"; "Institutionalized"; "Backseat Freestyle"; "M.A.A.D City" (second verse); "Swimming Pools (Drank)"; "Collard Greens"; "That Part"; "These Walls"; "Untitled 02 | 06.23.2014."; "Complexion (A Zulu Love)"; "Bitch, Don't Kill My Vibe"; "Money Trees"; "M.A.A.D City" (first verse); "King Kunta"; "Alright"; "I"	
American Express Secret Show	December 16, 2016	—N/a	Music Hall of Williamsburg	Brooklyn	United States	"Money Trees"; "M.A.A.D City"; "A.D.H.D"; "King Kunta"	
Spotify Beach Party at Cannes Lions	June 20, 2022	Cannes Lions International Festival of Creativity	Palais des Festivals et des Congrès	Cannes	France	"King Kunta"; "DNA"; "Bitch, Don't Kill My Vibe"; "Swimming Pools (Drank)"; "Money Trees"; "Humble"	
Yasalam After-Race Concert	November 19, 2022	2022 Abu Dhabi Grand Prix	Etihad Park	Abu Dhabi	United Arab Emirates	"United in Grief"; "N95"; "Die Hard"; "Humble"; "M.A.A.D City"; "DNA"; "King Kunta"; "Savior"	
An Evening with Kendrick Lamar	July 17, 2023	Arena di Verona Festival	Verona Arena	Verona	Italy	"N95"; "Element"; "A.D.H.D"; "King Kunta"; "Worldwide Steppers"; "Nosetalgia"; "Backseat Freestyle"; "Swimming Pools (Drank)"; "M.A.A.D City"; "DNA"; "Sidewalks"; "Rich Spirit"; "Humble"; "Loyalty"; "Count Me Out"; "Money Trees"; "Bitch, Don't Kill My Vibe"; "Die Hard"; "Love"; "Alright"; "Savior"	
GPWeek	November 5, 2023	2023 São Paulo Grand Prix	Allianz Parque	São Paulo	Brazil	"N95"; "Element"; "A.D.H.D"; "King Kunta"; "Worldwide Steppers"; "Nosetalgia"; "Backseat Freestyle"; "M.A.A.D City"; "Swimming Pools (Drank)"; "Loyalty"; "DNA"; "Rich Spirit"; "Humble"; "Sidewalks"; "Count Me Out"; "United in Grief" (intro); "Money Trees"; "Bitch, Don't Kill My Vibe"; "Die Hard"; "Love"; "Savior"; "Alright"	
Visa Cash App RB Formula One Team 2024 Livery Reveal	February 8, 2024	Super Bowl LVIII	Wynn Las Vegas	Las Vegas	United States	"Humble"; "Alright"; "Bitch, Don't Kill My Vibe"; "Swimming Pools (Drank)"; "Loyalty"; "Money Trees"; "Family Ties" (with Baby Keem); "Money Trees"; "Love"; "DNA"	
The Pop Out: Ken & Friends	June 19, 2024	Juneteenth	Kia Forum	Inglewood	United States	"Euphoria"; "DNA"; "ELEMENT"; "Alright"; "Swimming Pools (Drank)"; "Money Trees"; "WIN"; "King's Dead"; "6:16 in LA"; "Collard Greens"; "THat Part"; "King Kunta"; "M.A.A.D. City"; "HUMBLE"; "Like That"; "Not Like Us (x6)"	
2025 Super Bowl Halftime Show	February 9, 2025	Super Bowl LIX	Caesars Superdome	New Orleans	United States	"GNX" • "TV Off* "Squabble Up" • "Humble" • "Not Like Us" • "DNA" • "Euphoria" • "Man at the Garden" • "Peekaboo" • "Luther" • "All The Stars"	

== Benefit concerts ==
Date	Event	City	Performed song(s)	Ref.
November 18, 2011	Downtown Women's Center and RISHI Benefit	Los Angeles	"Fuck Your Ethnicity"; "Hol' Up"; "Michael Jordan"; "P&P"; "H.O.C"; "The Spiteful Chant"; "Rigamortis"; "Tammy's Song (Her Evils)"; "Ronald Reagan Era (His Evils)"; "Blow My High (Members Only)"; "A.D.H.D"; "HiiiPower"	
September 14, 2017	Clara Lionel Foundation Diamond Ball	New York City	"Humble"; "Swimming Pools (Drank)"; "Loyalty"; "Mask Off"; "Alright"	
May 15, 2023	Robin Hood Foundation Benefit	New York City	"Alright"; "Die Hard"; "Bitch, Don't Kill My Vibe"; "Humble"; "Loyalty"; "DNA"	
December 6, 2023	Move Afrika: Rwanda	Kigali	"United in Grief"; "N95"; "Element"; "A.D.H.D"; "Backseat Freestyle"; "Swimming Pools (Drank)"; "Poetic Justice"; "Bitch, Don't Kill My Vibe"; "M.A.A.D City"; "Loyalty"; "DNA"; "Rich Spirit"; "Humble"; "Count Me Out"; "King Kunta"; "I"; "Institutionalized"; "The Blacker the Berry"; "Money Trees"; "Love"; "Alright"; "Savior"	
December 12, 2024	11th Annual TDE Christmas Concert & Toy Drive	Los Angeles	"Squabble Up"; "Humble"	

== Music festivals ==
Date	Event	City	Country	Performed song(s)
July 31, 2011	Appelsap Fresh Music Festival	Amsterdam	Netherlands	"The Heart Part 2"; "Fuck Your Ethnicity"; "Hol' Up"; "P&P"; "She Needs Me"; "Ignorance Is Bliss"; "A.D.H.D"; "Tammy's Song (Her Evils)"; "The Spiteful Chant"; "Cut You Off (To Grow Closer)"; "Chapter Six"; "Michael Jordan"; "HiiiPower"
March 13, 2012	South by Southwest	Austin	United States	"HiiiPower"
March 17, 2012	South by Southwest	Austin	United States	"HiiiPower"
April 7, 2012	Paid Dues Festival	San Bernardino	United States	
April 13, 2012	Coachella Valley Music and Arts Festival	Indio	United States	"Fuck Your Ethnicity"; "Rigamortis"; "A.D.H.D"; "Michael Jordan"; "HiiiPower"
April 20, 2012	Coachella Valley Music and Arts Festival	Indio	United States	"Fuck Your Ethnicity"; "Rigamortis"; "A.D.H.D"; "Michael Jordan"; "HiiiPower"
May 27, 2012	Soundset Music Festival	Shakopee	United States	"P&P"; "A.D.H.D"; "Rigamortis"; "Michael Jordan"
June 1, 2012	Siesta!	Hässleholm	Sweden	"The Recipe"; "She Needs Me"
June 7, 2012	Bonnaroo Music and Arts Festival	Manchester	United States	"Fuck Your Ethnicity"; "Hol' Up"; "P&P"; "She Needs Me"; "A.D.H.D"; "Rigamortis"; "Look Out for Detox"; "Ronald Reagan Era (His Evils)"; "Chapter Six"; "Michael Jordan"; "Cut You Off (To Grow Closer)"; "Blow My High (Members Only)"; "The Recipe"; "HiiiPower"; "Cartoon and Cereal"
June 27, 2012	Cause Music Festival	Amsterdam	Netherlands	"Fuck Your Ethnicity"; "Blow My High (Members Only)"; "A.D.H.D"; "Rigamortis"
June 29, 2012	Hove Festival	Tromøya	Norway	"Fuck Your Ethnicity"; "Blow My High (Members Only)"; "A.D.H.D"; "Rigamortis"; "HiiiPower"
July 15, 2012	Pitchfork Music Festival	Chicago	United States	"Fuck Your Ethnicity"; "A.D.H.D"; "Rigamortis"; "P&P"; "Swimming Pools (Drank)"; "Cartoon and Cereal"; "HiiiPower"
March 8, 2013	Snowball Music Festival	Winter Park	United States	"Swimming Pools (Drank); "M.A.A.D City"; "Money Trees"
March 9, 2013	BUKU Music + Art Project	New Orleans	United States	"Fuckin' Problems"; "HiiiPower"
March 13, 2013	South by Southwest	Austin	United States	"Westside, Right On Time"; "Hol' Up"; "P&P"; "Fuckin' Problems"; "A.D.H.D"; "Terrorist Threats"; "R.I.P." (remix); "Money Trees" (with Jay Rock); "Backseat Freestyle"; "Hands on the Wheel" (Schoolboy Q cover; with Schoolboy Q); "Bitch, Don't Kill My Vibe"; "Poetic Justice"; "The Recipe" (with elements of "Real"); "Go Get It" (T.I. cover; with T.I.); "Swimming Pools (Drank)"; "M.A.A.D City" (first verse); "Cartoon and Cereal"
March 15, 2013	South by Southwest	Austin	United States	"Westside, Right On Time"; "Hol' Up"; "P&P"; "Fuckin' Problems"; "A.D.H.D"; "Terrorist Threats"; "R.I.P." (remix); "Money Trees" (with Jay Rock); "Backseat Freestyle"; "Hands on the Wheel" (Schoolboy Q cover; with Schoolboy Q); "Bitch, Don't Kill My Vibe"; "Poetic Justice"; "The Recipe" (with elements of "Real"); "Go Get It" (T.I. cover; with T.I.); "Swimming Pools (Drank)"; "M.A.A.D City" (first verse); "Cartoon and Cereal"
May 11, 2013	Sweetlife Music Festival	Columbia	United States	"Westside, Right On Time"; "Hol' Up"; "P&P"; "Fuckin' Problems"; "R.I.P." (remix); "Money Trees"; "Backseat Freestyle"; "Bitch, Don't Kill My Vibe"; "Poetic Justice"; "Chapter Six"; "The Recipe" (with elements of "Real"); "M.A.A.D City"; "Swimming Pools (Drank)"; "Cartoon and Cereal"
May 18, 2013	Hangout Music Festival	Gulf Shores	United States	"Hol' Up"; "P&P"; "Fuckin' Problems"; "R.I.P." (remix); "Money Trees"; "Backseat Freestyle"; "Bitch, Don't Kill My Vibe"; "Poetic Justice"; "The Recipe" (with elements of "Real")
May 25, 2013	BBC Radio 1's Big Weekend	Derry	Northern Ireland	"Westside, Right On Time"; "Hol' Up"; "P&P"; "Fuckin' Problems"; "R.I.P." (remix); "Money Trees"; "Backseat Freestyle"; "Bitch, Don't Kill My Vibe"; "Poetic Justice"; "Chapter Six"; "The Recipe" (with elements of "Real"); "M.A.A.D City"; "Swimming Pools (Drank)"; "Cartoon and Cereal"
June 8, 2013	Governors Ball Music Festival	New York City	United States	"Westside, Right On Time"; "Hol' Up"; "P&P"; "Fuckin' Problems"; "R.I.P." (remix); "Money Trees"; "Backseat Freestyle"; "Bitch, Don't Kill My Vibe"; "Poetic Justice"; "Chapter Six"; "The Recipe" (with elements of "Real"); "M.A.A.D City"; "Swimming Pools (Drank)"; "Cartoon and Cereal"
June 16, 2013	Bonnaroo Music and Art Festival	Manchester	United States	"Backseat Freestyle"; "P&P"; "Fuckin' Problems"; "R.I.P." (remix); "Money Trees"; "Bitch, Don't Kill My Vibe"; "Poetic Justice"; "The Recipe" (with elements of "Real"); "A.D.H.D"; "M.A.A.D City"; "Swimming Pools (Drank)"
June 22, 2013	Firefly Music Festival	Dover	United States	"Backseat Freestyle"; "P&P"; "Fuckin' Problems"; "R.I.P." (remix); "Money Trees"; "Bitch, Don't Kill My Vibe"; "Poetic Justice"; "The Recipe" (with elements of "Real"); "A.D.H.D"; "M.A.A.D City"; "Swimming Pools (Drank)"
July 3, 2013	Open'er Festival	Gdynia	Poland	"Backseat Freestyle"; "P&P"; "Fuckin' Problems"; "R.I.P." (remix); "Money Trees"; "Bitch, Don't Kill My Vibe"; "Poetic Justice"; "The Recipe" (with elements of "Real"); "A.D.H.D"; "M.A.A.D City"; "Swimming Pools (Drank)"
July 4, 2013	Roskilde Festival	Roskilde	Denmark	"Backseat Freestyle"; "P&P"; "Fuckin' Problems"; "R.I.P." (remix); "Money Trees"; "Bitch, Don't Kill My Vibe"; "Poetic Justice"; "The Recipe" (with elements of "Real"); "A.D.H.D"; "M.A.A.D City"; "Swimming Pools (Drank)"
July 5, 2013	Touch The Lake Festival	Zürich	Switzerland	"Backseat Freestyle"; "P&P"; "Fuckin' Problems"; "R.I.P." (remix); "Money Trees"; "Bitch, Don't Kill My Vibe"; "Poetic Justice"; "The Recipe" (with elements of "Real"); "A.D.H.D"; "M.A.A.D City"; "Swimming Pools (Drank)"
July 6, 2013	Rock Werchter	Werchter	Belgium	"Backseat Freestyle"; "P&P"; "Fuckin' Problems"; "R.I.P." (remix); "Money Trees"; "Bitch, Don't Kill My Vibe"; "Poetic Justice"; "The Recipe" (with elements of "Real"); "A.D.H.D"; "M.A.A.D City"; "Swimming Pools (Drank)"
July 7, 2013	Main Square Festival	Arras	France	"Backseat Freestyle"; "P&P"; "Fuckin' Problems"; "R.I.P." (remix); "Money Trees"; "Bitch, Don't Kill My Vibe"; "Poetic Justice"; "The Recipe" (with elements of "Real"); "A.D.H.D"; "M.A.A.D City"; "Swimming Pools (Drank)"
July 11, 2013	Splash!	Chemnitz	Germany	"Backseat Freestyle"; "P&P"; "Fuckin' Problems"; "R.I.P." (remix); "Money Trees"; "Bitch, Don't Kill My Vibe"; "Poetic Justice"; "The Recipe" (with elements of "Real"); "A.D.H.D"; "M.A.A.D City"; "Swimming Pools (Drank)"
July 12, 2013	T in the Park	Lanarkshire	Scotland	"Backseat Freestyle"; "P&P"; "Fuckin' Problems"; "R.I.P." (remix); "Money Trees"; "Bitch, Don't Kill My Vibe"; "Poetic Justice"; "The Recipe" (with elements of "Real"); "A.D.H.D"; "M.A.A.D City"; "Swimming Pools (Drank)"
July 13, 2013	Wireless Festival	London	England	"Poetic Justice"; "Money Trees"; "Backseat Freestyle"; "M.A.A.D City"; "Swimming Pools (Drank)"
July 14, 2013	North Sea Jazz Festival	Rotterdam	Netherlands	"The Art of Peer Pressure"; "M.A.A.D City"; "Backseat Freestyle"; "P&P"; "Fuckin' Problems"; "Money Trees"; "Bitch, Don't Kill My Vibe"; "Poetic Justice"; "The Recipe" (with elements of "Real"); "Mercy" (Kanye West cover); "Swimming Pools (Drank)"; "A.D.H.D"
July 17, 2013	Montreux Jazz Festival	Montreux	Switzerland	"The Art of Peer Pressure"; "M.A.A.D City"; "Backseat Freestyle"; "P&P"; "Fuckin' Problems"; "Money Trees"; "Bitch, Don't Kill My Vibe"; "Poetic Justice"; "The Recipe" (with elements of "Real"); "Mercy" (Kanye West cover); "Swimming Pools (Drank)"; "A.D.H.D"
July 20, 2013	Pori Jazz	Pori	Finland	"The Art of Peer Pressure"; "M.A.A.D City"; "Backseat Freestyle"; "P&P"; "Fuckin' Problems"; "Money Trees"; "Bitch, Don't Kill My Vibe"; "Poetic Justice"; "The Recipe" (with elements of "Real"); "Mercy" (Kanye West cover); "Swimming Pools (Drank)"; "A.D.H.D"
July 27, 2013	Fuji Rock Festival	Yuzawa	Japan	"The Art of Peer Pressure"; "M.A.A.D City" (second verse); "Backseat Freestyle"; "P&P"; "Fuckin' Problems"; "Money Trees"; "Bitch, Don't Kill My Vibe"; "Poetic Justice"; "The Recipe" (with elements of "Real"); "M.A.A.D City" (first verse); "Swimming Pools (Drank)
August 3, 2013	Lollapalooza	Chicago	United States	"Backseat Freestyle; "P&P"; "Fuckin' Problems"; "Money Trees"; "M.A.A.D City"; "The Recipe" (with elements of "Real"); "Bitch, Don't Kill My Vibe"; "Poetic Justice"; "Swimming Pools (Drank)"
August 4, 2013	Osheaga Festival	Montreal	Canada	"M.A.A.D City" (first verse); "Backseat Freestyle"; "R.I.P. (remix); "P&P"; "Fuckin' Problems"; "Money Trees"; "Poetic Justice"; "Bitch, Don't Kill My Vibe"; "The Recipe" (with elements of "Real"); "HiiiPower"; "A.D.H.D"; "M.A.A.D City" (second verse); "Swimming Pools (Drank)"
August 8, 2013	Øyafestivalen	Oslo	Norway	"M.A.A.D City" (first verse); "Backseat Freestyle"; "R.I.P. (remix); "P&P"; "Fuckin' Problems"; "Money Trees"; "Poetic Justice"; "Bitch, Don't Kill My Vibe"; "The Recipe" (with elements of "Real"); "HiiiPower"; "A.D.H.D"; "M.A.A.D City" (second verse); "Swimming Pools (Drank)"
August 9. 2013	Flow Festival	Helsinki	Finland	"M.A.A.D City"; "Swimming Pools (Drank)"
August 10, 2013	Way Out West	Gothenburg	Sweden	"M.A.A.D City" (second verse); "Backseat Freestyle"; "R.I.P. (remix); "P&P"; "Fuckin' Problems"; "Money Trees"; "Poetic Justice"; "Bitch, Don't Kill My Vibe"; "The Recipe" (with elements of "Real"); "HiiiPower"; "M.A.A.D City" (first verse); "Swimming Pools (Drank)"; "A.D.H.D"; "Hol' Up"; "Cut You Off (To Grow Closer)"; "HiiiPower"; "Cartoon and Cereal"
August 12, 2013	Pukkelpop	Hasselt	Belgium	"M.A.A.D City" (first verse); "Backseat Freestyle"; "R.I.P. (remix); "P&P"; "Fuckin' Problems"; "Money Trees"; "Bitch, Don't Kill My Vibe"; "The Recipe" (with elements of "Real"); "HiiiPower"; "A.D.H.D"; "M.A.A.D City" (second verse); "Swimming Pools (Drank)"
August 16, 2013	Lowlands Festival	Biddinghuizen	Netherlands	"M.A.A.D City" (first verse); "Backseat Freestyle"; "R.I.P. (remix); "P&P"; "Fuckin' Problems"; "Money Trees"; "Bitch, Don't Kill My Vibe"; "The Recipe" (with elements of "Real"); "HiiiPower"; "A.D.H.D"; "M.A.A.D City" (second verse); "Swimming Pools (Drank)"
August 17, 2013	V Festival	Weston-under-Lizard	England	"M.A.A.D City" (first verse); "Backseat Freestyle"; "R.I.P. (remix); "P&P"; "Fuckin' Problems"; "Money Trees"; "Bitch, Don't Kill My Vibe"; "The Recipe" (with elements of "Real"); "HiiiPower"; "A.D.H.D"; "M.A.A.D City" (second verse); "Swimming Pools (Drank)"
August 20, 2013	Glasgow Summer Sessions	Glasgow	Scotland	"Bitch, Don't Kill My Vibe"; "Money Trees"; "M.A.A.D City"; "Poetic Justice"; "Swimming Pools (Drank)"
August 23, 2013	Rock en Seine	Saint-Cloud	France	"M.A.A.D City" (second verse); "Backseat Freestyle"; "Fuckin' Problems"; "R.I.P." (remix); "Money Trees"; "Bitch, Don't Kill My Vibe"; "Poetic Justice"; "The Recipe" (with elements of "Real"); "M.A.A.D City" (first verse; with elements of "Mercy"); "Swimming Pools (Drank)"; "A.D.H.D"; "Cartoon and Cereal"
August 24, 2013	Hip Hop Kemp	Hradec Králové	Czech Republic	"M.A.A.D City" (second verse); "Backseat Freestyle"; "Fuckin' Problems"; "R.I.P." (remix); "Money Trees"; "Bitch, Don't Kill My Vibe"; "Poetic Justice"; "The Recipe" (with elements of "Real"); "M.A.A.D City" (first verse; with elements of "Mercy"); "Swimming Pools (Drank)"; "A.D.H.D"; "Cartoon and Cereal"
August 31, 2013	Bumbershoot	Seattle	United States	"M.A.A.D City" (second verse); "Backseat Freestyle"; "Fuckin' Problems"; "R.I.P." (remix); "Money Trees"; "Bitch, Don't Kill My Vibe"; "Poetic Justice"; "The Recipe" (with elements of "Real"); "M.A.A.D City" (first verse; with elements of "Mercy"); "Swimming Pools (Drank)"; "A.D.H.D"; "Cartoon and Cereal"
September 1, 2013	Made in America Festival	Philadelphia	United States	"M.A.A.D City" (first verse); "Backseat Freestyle"; "Fuckin' Problems"; "Money Trees"; "Bitch, Don't Kill My Vibe"; "M.A.A.D City" (second verse)
September 6, 2013	Ottawa Folk Festival	Ottawa	Canada	"M.A.A.D City" (second verse); "Backseat Freestyle"; "Fuckin' Problems"; "R.I.P." (remix); "Money Trees"; "Bitch, Don't Kill My Vibe"; "Poetic Justice"; "The Recipe" (with elements of "Real"); "M.A.A.D City" (first verse; with elements of "Mercy"); "Swimming Pools (Drank)"; "A.D.H.D"; "Cartoon and Cereal"
September 8, 2013	Boston Calling Music Festival	Boston	United States	"M.A.A.D City" (second verse); "Backseat Freestyle"; "Fuckin' Problems"; "R.I.P." (remix); "Money Trees"; "Bitch, Don't Kill My Vibe"; "Poetic Justice"; "The Recipe" (with elements of "Real"); "M.A.A.D City" (first verse; with elements of "Mercy"); "Swimming Pools (Drank)"; "A.D.H.D"; "Cartoon and Cereal"
September 19, 2013	iTunes Festival	London	England	"M.A.A.D City" (second verse); "Backseat Freestyle"; "P&P"; "Fuckin' Problems"; "R.I.P." (remix); "Money Trees"; "Bitch, Don't Kill My Vibe"; "Poetic Justice"; "The Recipe" (with elements of "Real"); "HiiiPower"; "M.A.A.D City" (first verse); "Swimming Pools (Drank)"; "Cartoon and Cereal"
September 21, 2013	Music Midtown	Atlanta	United States	"M.A.A.D City" (second verse); "Backseat Freestyle"; "P&P"; "Fuckin' Problems"; "R.I.P." (remix); "Money Trees"; "Bitch, Don't Kill My Vibe"; "Poetic Justice"; "The Recipe" (with elements of "Real"); "HiiiPower"; "M.A.A.D City" (first verse); "Swimming Pools (Drank)"; "Cartoon and Cereal"
October 5, 2013	Austin City Limits Music Festival	Austin	United States	"M.A.A.D City" (second verse); "Backseat Freestyle"; "P&P"; "Fuckin' Problems" (with elements of "Tha Shiznit"); "R.I.P." (remix); "Money Trees"; "Bitch, Don't Kill My Vibe"; "Poetic Justice"; "The Recipe" (with elements of "Real"); "HiiiPower"; "M.A.A.D City" (first verse); "Swimming Pools (Drank)"; "A.D.H.D"
October 19, 2013	Austin City Limits Music Festival	Austin	United States	"M.A.A.D City" (second verse); "Backseat Freestyle"; "P&P"; "Fuckin' Problems" (with elements of "Tha Shiznit"); "R.I.P." (remix); "Money Trees"; "Bitch, Don't Kill My Vibe"; "Poetic Justice"; "The Recipe" (with elements of "Real"); "HiiiPower"; "M.A.A.D City" (first verse); "Swimming Pools (Drank)"; "A.D.H.D"
February 23, 2014	7107 International Music Festival	Angeles	Philippines	"M.A.A.D City" (second verse); "Backseat Freestyle"; "P&P"; "Fuckin' Problems" (with elements of "Tha Shiznit"); "R.I.P." (remix); "Money Trees"; "Bitch, Don't Kill My Vibe"; "Poetic Justice"; "The Recipe" (with elements of "Real"); "HiiiPower"; "M.A.A.D City" (first verse); "Swimming Pools (Drank)"; "A.D.H.D"
March 12, 2014	South by Southwest	Austin	United States	"M.A.A.D City" (second verse); "Backseat Freestyle"; "A.D.H.D"; "Fuckin' Problems"; R.I.P." (remix); "Money Trees" (with Jay Rock); "Hood Gone Love It" (with Jay Rock); "Bitch, Don't Kill My Vibe" (with SZA); "Poetic Justice" (with SZA); "The Recipe" (with elements of "Real"); "HiiiPower"; "M.A.A.D City" (first verse); "Swimming Pools (Drank)"; "Cartoon and Cereal"
May 31, 2014	Primavera Sound Barcelona	Sant Adrià de Besòs	Spain	"Money Trees"; "Backseat Freestyle"; "M.A.A.D City" (second verse); "The Art of Peer Pressure (first verse); "Swimming Pools (Drank)"; "Fuckin' Problems" (with elements of "The Next Episode"); "Bitch, Don't Kill My Vibe"; "Poetic Justice"; "Hail Mary" (Makaveli cover); "M.A.A.D City" (first verse); "Sing About Me, I'm Dying of Thirst" (first half); "The Recipe" (with elements of "Real"); "Compton"
June 5, 2014	Primavera Sound Porto	Porto	Portugal	"Money Trees"; "Backseat Freestyle"; "M.A.A.D City" (second verse); "The Art of Peer Pressure (first verse); "Swimming Pools (Drank)"; "Fuckin' Problems" (with elements of "The Next Episode"); "Bitch, Don't Kill My Vibe"; "Poetic Justice"; "Hail Mary" (Makaveli cover); "M.A.A.D City" (first verse); "Sing About Me, I'm Dying of Thirst" (first half); "The Recipe" (with elements of "Real"); "Compton"
June 7, 2014	Parklife	Manchester	England	"Money Trees"; "Backseat Freestyle"; "M.A.A.D City" (second verse); "The Art of Peer Pressure (first verse); "Swimming Pools (Drank)"; "Fuckin' Problems" (with elements of "The Next Episode"); "Bitch, Don't Kill My Vibe"; "Poetic Justice"; "Hail Mary" (Makaveli cover); "M.A.A.D City" (first verse); "Sing About Me, I'm Dying of Thirst" (first half); "The Recipe" (with elements of "Real"); "Compton"
July 11, 2014	The Hudson Project	Saugerties	United States	"M.A.A.D City" (second verse); "Backseat Freestyle"; "P&P"; "Fuckin' Problems"; "R.I.P." (remix); "Money Trees" (with Jay Rock); "Bitch, Don't Kill My Vibe"; "Poetic Justice"; "Collard Greens"; "The Recipe" (with elements of "Real"); "HiiiPower"; "A.D.H.D"; "Sing About Me, I'm Dying of Thirst"; "Swimming Pools (Drank)"; "Cartoon and Cereal"; "M.A.A.D City" (first verse)
July 12, 2014	The Hudson Project	Saugerties	United States	"M.A.A.D City" (second verse); "Backseat Freestyle"; "P&P"; "Fuckin' Problems"; "R.I.P." (remix); "Money Trees" (with Jay Rock); "Bitch, Don't Kill My Vibe"; "Poetic Justice"; "Collard Greens"; "The Recipe" (with elements of "Real"); "HiiiPower"; "A.D.H.D"; "Sing About Me, I'm Dying of Thirst"; "Swimming Pools (Drank)"; "Cartoon and Cereal"; "M.A.A.D City" (first verse)
July 18, 2014	Pemberton Music Festival	Pemberton	Canada	"Backseat Freestyle"; "Poetic Justice"; "Swimming Pools (Drank)"; "M.A.A.D City"
July 20, 2014	Pitchfork Music Festival	Chicago	United States	"Money Trees"; "Backseat Freestyle"; "M.A.A.D City"; "Poetic Justice"; "Bitch, Don't Kill My Vibe"; "Swimming Pools (Drank)"; "Hail Mary"; "Sing About Me, I'm Dying of Thirst"; "Compton"; "A.D.H.D"
August 30, 2014	Made in America Festival	Los Angeles	United States	"Money Trees"; "Backseat Freestyle"; "M.A.A.D City" (second verse); "The Art of Peer Pressure"; "Swimming Pools (Drank)"; "Fuckin' Problems"; "Bitch, Don't Kill My Vibe"; "Poetic Justice"; "Collard Greens" (with Schoolboy Q); "M.A.A.D City" (first verse)
February 21, 2015	Air + Style Festival	Pasadena	United States	"Money Trees"; "Backseat Freestyle"; "Fuckin' Problems"; "Bitch, Don't Kill My Vibe"; "M.A.A.D City"
March 14, 2015	Pot of Gold Music Festival	Tempe	United States	"Money Trees"; "Backseat Freestyle"; "The Art of Peer Pressure"; "Swimming Pools (Drank)"; "Fuckin' Problems"; "Bitch, Don't Kill My Vibe"; "Poetic Justice"; "Hail Mary"; "M.A.A.D City"; "Sing About Me, I'm Dying of Thirst"; "A.D.H.D"
May 25, 2015	Sasquatch! Music Festival	George	United States	"Money Trees"; "Backseat Freestyle"; "The Art of Peer Pressure"; "Fuckin' Problems"; "Bitch, Don't Kill My Vibe"; "Poetic Justice"; "Swimming Pools (Drank)"; "M.A.A.D City"; "Sing About Me, I'm Dying of Thirst"; "Alright"; "A.D.H.D"
May 30, 2015	Sweetlife Music Festival	Columbia	United States	"Money Trees"; "Backseat Freestyle"; "M.A.A.D City" (second verse); "The Art of Peer Pressure"; "Swimming Pools (Drank)"; "Fuckin' Problems"; "Bitch, Don't Kill My Vibe"; "Poetic Justice"; "M.A.A.D City" (first verse); "Sing About Me, I'm Dying of Thirst"; "Alright"; "A.D.H.D"
June 12, 2015	Bonnaroo Music and Arts Festival	Manchester	United States	"Money Trees"; "Backseat Freestyle"; "M.A.A.D City" (second verse); "The Art of Peer Pressure"; "Swimming Pools (Drank)" (with an extended intro); "Fuckin' Problems" (with elements of "Tha Shiznit"); "Bitch, Don't Kill My Vibe" (remix); "Poetic Justice"; "Hail Mary"; "M.A.A.D City" (first verse); "Sing About Me, I'm Dying of Thirst"; "I"; "These Walls" (with Anna Wise); "King Kunta"; "Alright"
July 1, 2015	Summerfest	Milwaukee	United States	"Money Trees"; "Backseat Freestyle"; "M.A.A.D City" (second verse); "The Art of Peer Pressure"; "Swimming Pools (Drank)"; "Fuckin' Problems"; "Bitch, Don't Kill My Vibe" (remix); "Poetic Justice"; "M.A.A.D City" (first verse); "Sing About Me, I'm Dying of Thirst"; "I"; "King Kunta"; "Alright"; "Hood Politics" / "A.D.H.D"
July 3, 2015	Roskilde Festival	Roskilde	Denmark	"Money Trees"; "Backseat Freestyle"; "M.A.A.D City" (second verse); "The Art of Peer Pressure" / "Swimming Pools (Drank)"; "Fuckin' Problems"; "Bitch, Don't Kill My Vibe" (remix); "Poetic Justice"; "M.A.A.D City" (first verse); "Sing About Me, I'm Dying of Thirst"; "I"; "King Kunta"; "Alright"; "A.D.H.D"; "Compton"
July 4, 2015	Wireless Festival	London	England	"Money Trees"; "Backseat Freestyle"; "M.A.A.D City" (second verse); "The Art of Peer Pressure"; "Swimming Pools (Drank)"; "Collard Greens"; "Classic Man"; "Bitch, Don't Kill My Vibe" (remix); "Poetic Justice"; "M.A.A.D City" (first verse); "The Recipe" (with elements of "Real"); "I"; "King Kunta"; "Alright"; "A.D.H.D"; "Compton"
July 5, 2015	Essence Music Festival	New Orleans	United States	"Money Trees"; "Backseat Freestyle"; "M.A.A.D City" (second verse); "The Art of Peer Pressure"; "Swimming Pools (Drank)"; "Collard Greens"; "Classic Man"; "Bitch, Don't Kill My Vibe" (remix); "Poetic Justice"; "M.A.A.D City" (first verse); "The Recipe" (with elements of "Real"); "I"; "King Kunta"; "Alright"; "A.D.H.D"; "Compton"
July 9, 2015	Les Ardentes	Liège	Belgium	"Money Trees"; "Backseat Freestyle"; "M.A.A.D City" (second verse); "Swimming Pools (Drank)"; "Bitch, Don't Kill My Vibe"; "Poetic Justice"; "M.A.A.D City" (first verse); "Sing About Me, I'm Dying of Thirst"; "I"; "King Kunta"; "Alright"; "Real"
July 10, 2015	Cruïlla Barcelona	Sant Adrià de Besòs	Spain	"Money Trees"; "Backseat Freestyle"; "Swimming Pools (Drank)"; "I"; "King Kunta"; "The Recipe"; "Hail Mary"; "M.A.A.D City"; "Poetic Justice"; "Alright"; "Bitch, Don't Kill My Vibe"; "Complexion (A Zulu Love)"; "A.D.H.D"
July 11, 2015	Openair Frauenfeld	Fraunfeld	Switzerland	"Money Trees"; "Bitch, Don't Kill My Vibe"; "A.D.H.D"; "Fuckin' Problems"; "Sing About Me, I'm Dying of Thirst"; "M.A.A.D City"; "I"; "Poetic Justice"; "Swimming Pools (Drank)"; "The Recipe"
July 19, 2015	Pemberton Music Festival	Pemberton	Canada	"Money Trees"; "Backseat Freestyle"; "M.A.A.D City" (second verse); "The Art of Peer Pressure" (second half); "Swimming Pools (Drank)"; "Fuckin' Problems"; "Bitch, Don't Kill My Vibe" (remix); "Poetic Justice"; "Hail Mary" / "Mercy"; "M.A.A.D City" (first verse); "Sing About Me, I'm Dying of Thirst" (first half); "I"; "The Recipe" (with elements of "Real"); "Two Presidents" (with YG Hootie); "King Kunta"; "Alright"; "A.D.H.D"; "Compton"
July 25, 2015	WayHome Music & Arts Festival	Oro-Medonte	Canada	"Money Trees"; "Backseat Freestyle"; "M.A.A.D City" (second verse); "The Art of Peer Pressure" (first verse); "Swimming Pools (Drank)"; "Fuckin' Problems"; "Bitch, Don't Kill My Vibe"; "Poetic Justice"; "M.A.A.D City" (first verse); "Sing About Me, I'm Dying of Thirst" (first half); "I"; "King Kunta"; "The Recipe" (with elements of "Real"); "A.D.H.D"; "Alright"; "Compton"
August 1, 2015	Osheaga Festival	Montreal	Canada	"Money Trees"; "Backseat Freestyle"; "M.A.A.D City" (second verse); "The Art of Peer Pressure" (first verse); "Swimming Pools (Drank)"; "Fuckin' Problems"; "Bitch, Don't Kill My Vibe"; "Poetic Justice"; "M.A.A.D City" (first verse); "Sing About Me, I'm Dying of Thirst" (first half); "I"; "The Recipe" (with elements of "Real"); "King Kunta"; "Alright"; "Compton"
August 8, 2015	Outside Lands Music and Arts Festival	San Francisco	United States	"Money Trees"; "Backseat Freestyle"; "M.A.A.D City" (second verse); "The Art of Peer Pressure" (first verse); "Swimming Pools (Drank)"; "Fuckin' Problems"; "Bitch, Don't Kill My Vibe" (remix); "Poetic Justice"; "M.A.A.D City" (first verse); "Sing About Me, I'm Dying of Thirst" (first half); "I"; "The Recipe" (with elements of "Real"); "King Kunta"; "Alright"; "Compton"
August 21, 2015	Live Music Festival	Kraków	Poland	"Money Trees"; "Backseat Freestyle"; "M.A.A.D City" (second verse); "The Art of Peer Pressure" (first verse); "Swimming Pools (Drank)"; "Fuckin' Problems"; "Bitch, Don't Kill My Vibe" (remix); "Poetic Justice"; "M.A.A.D City" (first verse); "Sing About Me, I'm Dying of Thirst" (first half); "I"; "The Recipe" (with elements of "Real"); "King Kunta"; "Alright"; "Compton"
August 22, 2015	FM4 Frequency Festival	Sankt Pölten	Austria	"Money Trees"; "Backseat Freestyle"; "M.A.A.D City" (second verse); "The Art of Peer Pressure" (first verse); "Swimming Pools (Drank)"; "Fuckin' Problems"; "Bitch, Don't Kill My Vibe" (remix); "Poetic Justice"; "M.A.A.D City" (first verse); "Sing About Me, I'm Dying of Thirst" (first half); "I"; "The Recipe" (with elements of "Real"); "King Kunta"; "Alright"; "Compton"
August 23, 2015	Lowlands Festival	Biddinghuizen	Netherlands	"Money Trees"; "Backseat Freestyle"; "M.A.A.D City" (second verse); "The Art of Peer Pressure" (first verse); "Swimming Pools (Drank)"; "Fuckin' Problems"; "Bitch, Don't Kill My Vibe" (remix); "Poetic Justice"; "M.A.A.D City" (first verse); "Sing About Me, I'm Dying of Thirst" (first half); "I"; "The Recipe" (with elements of "Real"); "King Kunta"; "Alright"; "Compton"
August 28, 2015	Reading and Leeds Festival	Leeds	England	"Money Trees"; "Backseat Freestyle"; "M.A.A.D City" (second verse); "The Art of Peer Pressure" (first verse); "Swimming Pools (Drank)"; "Fuckin' Problems"; "Bitch, Don't Kill My Vibe" (remix); "Poetic Justice"; "Hail Mary"; "M.A.A.D City" (first verse); "I"; "Sing About Me, I'm Dying of Thirst" (first half); "The Recipe" (with elements of "Real"); "Alright"; "King Kunta"; "A.D.H.D"
August 30, 2015	Reading and Leeds Festival	Reading	England	"Money Trees"; "Backseat Freestyle"; "M.A.A.D City" (second verse); "The Art of Peer Pressure" (first verse); "Swimming Pools (Drank)"; "Fuckin' Problems"; "Bitch, Don't Kill My Vibe" (remix); "Poetic Justice"; "Hail Mary"; "M.A.A.D City" (first verse); "I"; "Sing About Me, I'm Dying of Thirst" (first half); "The Recipe" (with elements of "Real"); "Alright"; "King Kunta"; "A.D.H.D"
September 27, 2015	Life Is Beautiful Music & Art Festival	Las Vegas	United States	"Money Trees"; "Backseat Freestyle"; "M.A.A.D City"; "Poetic Justice"; "Bitch, Don't Kill My Vibe"; "I"; "King Kunta"; "A.D.H.D"; "Real"; "Alright"; "Compton"
December 20, 2015	Day for Night	Houston	United States	"For Free? (Interlude)"; "Wesley's Theory"; "Institutionalized" / "Backseat Freestyle"; "Bitch, Don't Kill My Vibe" (remix); "M.A.A.D City" (second verse); "The Art of Peer Pressure" (alternate verse); "Swimming Pools (Drank)"; "Hood Politics"; "Money Trees"; "M.A.A.D City" (first verse); "King Kunta"; "U"; "I"; "Alright"; "A.D.H.D" (with elements of "I Am")
March 5, 2016	Okeechobee Music & Arts Festival	Okeechobee	United States	"For Free? (Interlude)"; "Wesley's Theory"; "Institutionalized" / "Backseat Freestyle"; "Bitch, Don't Kill My Vibe" (remix); "M.A.A.D City" (second verse); "The Art of Peer Pressure"; "Swimming Pools (Drank)"; "These Walls"; "Hood Politics"; "Complexion (A Zulu Love)"; "Money Trees"; "M.A.A.D City" (first verse); "U"; "King Kunta"; "I"; "Alright" (with Mac Miller
March 19, 2016	Auckland City Limits	Auckland	New Zealand	"For Free? (Interlude)", "Wesley's Theory", "Institutionalized" / "Backseat Freestyle", "These Walls", "Swimming Pools (Drank)", "u", "Money Trees", "Hood Politics", "Bitch, Don't Kill My Vibe" "For Sale?" "m.A.A.d City", "Complexion (A Zulu Love)", "King Kunta", "i", "Alright"
March 27, 2016	Byron Bay Bluesfest	Byron Bay	Australia	"For Free? (Interlude)"; "Wesley's Theory"; "Institutionalized" / "Backseat Freestyle"; "Bitch, Don't Kill My Vibe" (remix); "M.A.A.D City" (second verse); "The Art of Peer Pressure" (second half); "Swimming Pools (Drank)"; "These Walls"; "For Sale? (Interlude)"; "Hood Politics"; "Complexion (A Zulu Love)"; "Money Trees"; "M.A.A.D City" (first verse); "U"; "King Kunta"; "Momma"; "I"; "Alright"
April 2, 2016	March Madness Music Festival	Houston	United States	"Untitled 07 | 2014–2016"; "For Free? (Interlude)"; "Wesley's Theory"; "Institutionalized" / "Backseat Freestyle"; "Bitch, Don't Kill My Vibe" (remix); "M.A.A.D City" (second verse); "The Art of Peer Pressure"; "Swimming Pools (Drank)"; "These Walls"; "Hood Politics"; "Complexion (A Zulu Love)"; "Money Trees"; "M.A.A.D City" (first verse); "King Kunta"; "Momma"; "A.D.H.D"; "I"; "Untitled 07 | 2014–2016"; "Alright"
July 2, 2016	British Summer Time	London	England	"For Free? (Interlude)"; "Wesley's Theory"; "Institutionalized" / "Backseat Freestyle"; "Bitch, Don't Kill My Vibe" (remix); "M.A.A.D City" (second verse); "The Art of Peer Pressure"; "Swimming Pools (Drank)"; "These Walls"; "Hood Politics"; "Complexion (A Zulu Love)"; "Money Trees"; "M.A.A.D City" (first verse); "King Kunta"; "Alright"
Jul3 3, 2016	Essence Music Festival	New Orleans	United States	"For Free? (Interlude)"; "Wesley's Theory"; "Institutionalized" / "Backseat Freestyle"; "Bitch, Don't Kill My Vibe" (remix); "M.A.A.D City" (second verse); "The Art of Peer Pressure"; "Swimming Pools (Drank)"; "These Walls"; "Hood Politics"; "Complexion (A Zulu Love)"; "Money Trees"; "M.A.A.D City" (first verse); "King Kunta"; "Alright"
July 15, 2016	Longitude Festival	Dublin	Ireland	"Untitled 07 | 2014–2016"; "Backseat Freestyle"; "For Sale? (Interlude)"; "Bitch, Don't Kill My Vibe" (remix); "M.A.A.D City" (second verse); "The Art of Peer Pressure" (second half); "Hood Politics"; "Momma" / "Swimming Pools (Drank)"; "These Walls"; "Money Trees"; "M.A.A.D City" (first verse); "U"; "Complexion (A Zulu Love)"; "King Kunta"; "I"; "Alright"; "A.D.H.D"
July 16, 2016	Super Bock Super Rock	Lisbon	Portugal	"Untitled 07 | 2014–2016"; "Institutionalized / "Backseat Freestyle"; "M.A.A.D City" (second verse); "The Art of Peer Pressure" (first half); "Swimming Pools (Drank)"; "These Walls"; "For Sale? (Interlude)"; "Hood Politics"; "Complexion (A Zulu Love)"; "Bitch, Don't Kill My Vibe" (remix); "Money Trees"; "M.A.A.D City" (first verse); "King Kunta" (with elements of "A.D.H.D"); "I"; "For Free? (Interlude)"; "Wesley's Theory"; "Alright"
July 17, 2016	Benicàssim	Benicàssim	Spain	"Untitled 07 | 2014–2016"; "Institutionalized / "Backseat Freestyle"; "A.D.H.D"; "Complexion (A Zulu Love)"; "Swimming Pools (Drank)"; "These Walls"; "Hood Politics"; "King Kunta"; "Money Trees"; "Bitch, Don't Kill My Vibe"; "I"; "M.A.A.D City"; "Alright"
July 23, 2016	Panorama Music Festival	New York City	United States	"Untitled 07 | 2014–2016"; "Momma"; "Institutionalized / "Backseat Freestyle"; "M.A.A.D City" (second verse); "Collard Greens"; "That Part" (Schoolboy Q cover); "These Walls"; "For Sale? (Interlude)"; "Untitled 02 | 06.23.2014."; "Complexion (A Zulu Love)"; "Bitch, Don't Kill My Vibe"; "Money Trees"; "M.A.A.D City" (first verse); "King Kunta"; "I"; "For Free? (Interlude)"; "Wesley's Theory"; "Alright"; "A.D.H.D"
August 27, 2016	FYF Fest	Los Angeles	United States	"Untitled 07 | 2014–2016"; "Momma"; "Institutionalized / "Backseat Freestyle"; "M.A.A.D City" (second verse); "Collard Greens"; "That Part" (Schoolboy Q cover); "Free Lunch" (Isaiah Rashad cover; with Isaiah Rashad); "These Walls"; "For Sale? (Interlude)"; "Untitled 02 | 06.23.2014."; "Complexion (A Zulu Love)"; "Bitch, Don't Kill My Vibe"; "Money Trees" (with Jay Rock); "M.A.A.D City" (first verse); "King Kunta"; "I"; "For Free? (Interlude)"; "Wesley's Theory"; "Alright"; "A.D.H.D"
September 24, 2016	Global Citizen Festival	New York City	United States	"Untitled 07 | 2014–2016"; "Institutionalized / "Backseat Freestyle"; "M.A.A.D City" (second verse); "Collard Greens"; "That Part" (Schoolboy Q cover); "Untitled 02 | 06.23.2014."; "Complexion (A Zulu Love)"; "Bitch, Don't Kill My Vibe"; "Money Trees"; "M.A.A.D City" (first verse); "King Kunta"; "I"; "Alright"
October 1, 2016	Austin City Limits Music Festival	Austin	United States	"Untitled 07 | 2014–2016"; "Institutionalized / "Backseat Freestyle"; "M.A.A.D City" (second verse); "Collard Greens"; "That Part" (Schoolboy Q cover; with Schoolboy Q); "These Walls"; "For Sale? (Interlude)"; "Untitled 02 | 06.23.2014."; "Complexion (A Zulu Love)"; "Bitch, Don't Kill My Vibe"; "Money Trees"; "M.A.A.D City" (first verse); "King Kunta"; "I"; "For Free? (Interlude)"; "Alright"; "A.D.H.D"
October 8, 2016	Austin City Limits Music Festival	Austin	United States	"Untitled 07 | 2014–2016"; "Institutionalized / "Backseat Freestyle"; "M.A.A.D City" (second verse); "Collard Greens"; "That Part" (Schoolboy Q cover; with Schoolboy Q); "These Walls"; "For Sale? (Interlude)"; "Untitled 02 | 06.23.2014."; "Complexion (A Zulu Love)"; "Bitch, Don't Kill My Vibe"; "Money Trees"; "M.A.A.D City" (first verse); "King Kunta"; "I"; "For Free? (Interlude)"; "Alright"; "A.D.H.D"
April 16, 2017	Coachella Valley Music and Arts Festival	Indio	United States	"DNA"; "Element"; "King Kunta"; "Untitled 07 | 2014–2016"; "Untitled 02 | 06.23.2014."; "Goosebumps" (with Travis Scott); "Backseat Freestyle" (with elements of "Swimming Pools (Drank)"); "That Part" (Schoolboy Q cover; with Schoolboy Q and elements of "Feel"); "Lust"; "Money Trees"; "XXX"; "M.A.A.D City" (first verse); "Pride" (with elements of "Yah"); "Mask Off" (remix; with Future); "Alright"; "God" (with elements of "Feel"); "Humble"; "Love"
April 23, 2017	Coachella Valley Music and Arts Festival	Indio	United States	"DNA"; "Element"; "King Kunta"; "Untitled 07 | 2014–2016"; "Untitled 02 | 06.23.2014."; "Goosebumps"; "Backseat Freestyle" (with elements of "Swimming Pools (Drank)"); "Collard Greens"; "Lust"; "Money Trees"; "XXX"; "M.A.A.D City" (first verse); "Pride" (with elements of "Yah"); "I"; "Alright"; "God" (with elements of "Feel"); "Humble"; "Love"
May 6, 2017	Rolling Loud	Miami	United States	"DNA"; "Element"; "King Kunta" (with elements of "Yah"); "Untitled 07 | 2014–2016"; "Untitled 02 | 06.23.2014."; "Goosebumps"; "Collard Greens"; "Swimming Pools (Drank)"; "Backseat Freestyle"; "Bitch, Don't Kill My Vibe"; "Lust"; "Money Trees"; "XXX"; "M.A.A.D City" (first verse); "Pride" (with elements of "Yah"); "I"; "Alright"; "God" (with elements of "Feel"); "Humble"
July 7, 2017	Festival d'été de Québec	Quebec City	Canada	"DNA"; "Element"; "King Kunta" (with elements of "Yah"); "Untitled 07 | 2014–2016"; "Untitled 02 | 06.23.2014."; "Collard Greens"; "Swimming Pools (Drank)"; "Backseat Freestyle"; "Lust"; "M.A.A.D City" (first verse); "Money Trees"; "Humble" (with elements of "XXX"); "Alright"; "Pride"; "Goosebumps"; "God"; "Love"
August 26, 2017	Hellow Festival	Monterrey	Mexico	"DNA"; "Element"; "King Kunta" (with elements of "Yah"); "Untitled 07 | 2014–2016"; "Mask Off" (remix); "Collard Greens"; "Swimming Pools (Drank)"; "Backseat Freestyle"; "Loyalty"; "Money Trees"; "M.A.A.D City"; "Bitch, Don't Kill My Vibe"; "Alright"; "Humble"
September 10, 2017	Day N Night Festival	Anaheim	United States	"DNA"; "Element"; "King Kunta" (with elements of "Yah"); "Untitled 07 | 2014–2016"; "Mask Off" (remix); "Collard Greens"; "Swimming Pools (Drank)"; "Backseat Freestyle"; "Loyalty"; "Money Trees"; "M.A.A.D City"; "Bitch, Don't Kill My Vibe"; "Alright"; "Humble"
October 27, 2017	Voodoo Music + Arts Experience	New Orleans	United States	"DNA"; "Element"; "King Kunta" (with elements of "Yah"); "Untitled 07 | 2014–2016"; "Mask Off" (remix); "Collard Greens"; "Swimming Pools (Drank)"; "Backseat Freestyle"; "Loyalty"; "Feel"; "Money Trees"; "M.A.A.D City"; "Pride"; "Love"; "Bitch, Don't Kill My Vibe"; "Alright"; "Humble"
May 20, 2018	Hangout Music Festival	Gulf Shores	United States	"DNA"; "Big Shot"; "King Kunta" (with elements of "Yah"); "Untitled 07 | 2014–2016"; "Goosebumps"; "New Freezer"; "Swimming Pools (Drank)"; "Backseat Freestyle"; "Loyalty"; "Money Trees" (with Jay Rock); "King's Dead"; "M.A.A.D City"; "Love"; "Bitch, Don't Kill My Vibe"; "Alright"; "Humble"
June 17, 2018	Firefly Music Festival	Dover	United States	"DNA"; "Big Shot"; "King Kunta" (with elements of "Yah"); "Untitled 07 | 2014–2016"; "Goosebumps"; "New Freezer"; "Swimming Pools (Drank)"; "Backseat Freestyle"; "Loyalty"; "Money Trees" (with Jay Rock); "King's Dead"; "XXX"; "M.A.A.D City"; "Love"; "Bitch, Don't Kill My Vibe"; "Alright"; "Humble"
July 22, 2018	Splendour in the Grass	Yelgun	Australia	"DNA"; "Element"; "King Kunta" (with elements of "Yah"); "Big Shot"; "Goosebumps"; "New Freezer"; "Swimming Pools (Drank)"; "Backseat Freestyle"; "Money Trees"; "XXX"; "M.A.A.D City" (first verse); "Love"; "Pride"; "Bitch, Don't Kill My Vibe" (remix); "Alright"; "Humble"
July 28, 2018	Fuji Rock Festival	Yuzawa	Japan	"DNA"; "Element"; "Big Shot"; "King Kunta" (with elements of "Yah"); "Untitled 07 | 2014–2016"; "Goosebumps"; "New Freezer"; "Collard Greens"; "Swimming Pools (Drank)"; "Backseat Freestyle"; "Loyalty"; "Money Trees"; "XXX"; "M.A.A.D City"; "Love"; "Bitch, Don't Kill My Vibe"; "Alright"; "Humble"; "All the Stars"
August 8, 2018	Sziget Festival	Budapest	Hungary	"DNA"; "Element"; "Big Shot"; "King Kunta" (with elements of "Yah"); "Untitled 07 | 2014–2016"; "Goosebumps"; "New Freezer"; "Collard Greens"; "Swimming Pools (Drank)"; "Backseat Freestyle"; "Loyalty"; "Money Trees"; "XXX"; "M.A.A.D City"; "Love"; "Bitch, Don't Kill My Vibe"; "Alright"; "Humble"; "All the Stars"
August 9, 2018	Øyafestivalen	Oslo	Norway	"DNA"; "Element"; "Big Shot"; "King Kunta" (with elements of "Yah"); "Untitled 07 | 2014–2016"; "Goosebumps"; "New Freezer"; "Collard Greens"; "Swimming Pools (Drank)"; "Backseat Freestyle"; "Loyalty"; "Money Trees"; "XXX"; "M.A.A.D City"; "Love"; "Bitch, Don't Kill My Vibe"; "Alright"; "Humble"; "All the Stars"
August 10, 2018	Way Out West	Gothenburg	Sweden	"DNA"; "Element"; "Big Shot"; "King Kunta" (with elements of "Yah"); "Untitled 07 | 2014–2016"; "Goosebumps"; "New Freezer"; "Collard Greens"; "Swimming Pools (Drank)"; "Backseat Freestyle"; "Loyalty"; "Money Trees"; "XXX"; "M.A.A.D City"; "Love"; "Bitch, Don't Kill My Vibe"; "Alright"; "Humble"; "All the Stars"
August 11, 2018	Smukfest	Skanderborg	Denmark	"DNA"; "Element"; "Big Shot"; "King Kunta" (with elements of "Yah"); "Untitled 07 | 2014–2016"; "Goosebumps"; "New Freezer"; "Collard Greens"; "Swimming Pools (Drank)"; "Backseat Freestyle"; "Loyalty"; "Money Trees"; "XXX"; "M.A.A.D City"; "Love"; "Bitch, Don't Kill My Vibe"; "Alright"; "Humble"; "All the Stars"
August 12, 2018	Flow Festival	Helsinki	Finland	"DNA"; "Element"; "Big Shot"; "King Kunta" (with elements of "Yah"); "Untitled 07 | 2014–2016"; "Goosebumps"; "New Freezer"; "Collard Greens"; "Swimming Pools (Drank)"; "Backseat Freestyle"; "Loyalty"; "Money Trees"; "XXX"; "M.A.A.D City"; "Love"; "Bitch, Don't Kill My Vibe"; "Alright"; "Humble"; "All the Stars"
August 17, 2018	Live Festival	Kraków	Poland	"DNA"; "Element"; "Big Shot"; "King Kunta" (with elements of "Yah"); "Untitled 07 | 2014–2016"; "Goosebumps"; "New Freezer"; "Collard Greens"; "Swimming Pools (Drank)"; "Backseat Freestyle"; "Loyalty"; "Money Trees"; "XXX"; "M.A.A.D City"; "Love"; "Bitch, Don't Kill My Vibe"; "Alright"; "Humble"; "All the Stars"
August 18, 2018	Pukkelpop	Hasselt	Belgium	"DNA"; "Element"; "Big Shot"; "King Kunta" (with elements of "Yah"); "Untitled 07 | 2014–2016"; "Goosebumps"; "New Freezer"; "Collard Greens"; "Swimming Pools (Drank)"; "Backseat Freestyle"; "Loyalty"; "Money Trees"; "XXX"; "M.A.A.D City"; "Love"; "Bitch, Don't Kill My Vibe"; "Alright"; "Humble"; "All the Stars"
August 19, 2018	Lowlands Festival	Biddinghuizen	Netherlands	"DNA"; "Element"; "Big Shot"; "King Kunta" (with elements of "Yah"); "Untitled 07 | 2014–2016"; "Goosebumps"; "New Freezer"; "Collard Greens"; "Swimming Pools (Drank)"; "Backseat Freestyle"; "Loyalty"; "Money Trees"; "XXX"; "M.A.A.D City"; "Love"; "Bitch, Don't Kill My Vibe"; "Alright"; "Humble"; "All the Stars"
August 23, 2018	Zürich Openair	Rümlang	Switzerland	"DNA"; "Element"; "Big Shot"; "King Kunta" (with elements of "Yah"); "Untitled 07 | 2014–2016"; "Goosebumps"; "New Freezer"; "Collard Greens"; "Swimming Pools (Drank)"; "Backseat Freestyle"; "Loyalty"; "Money Trees"; "XXX"; "M.A.A.D City"; "Love"; "Bitch, Don't Kill My Vibe"; "Alright"; "Humble"; "All the Stars"
August 25, 2018	Reading and Leeds Festival	Reading	England	"DNA"; "Element"; "Big Shot"; "King Kunta" (with elements of "Yah"); "Goosebumps"; "New Freezer"; "Collard Greens"; "Swimming Pools (Drank)"; "Backseat Freestyle"; "Loyalty"; "XXX"; "M.A.A.D City"; "Money Trees"; "Pride"; "Alright"; "Humble"; "Bitch, Don't Kill My Vibe" (remix)
August 26, 2018	Reading and Leeds Festival	Leeds	England	"DNA"; "Element"; "Big Shot"; "King Kunta" (with elements of "Yah"); "Goosebumps"; "New Freezer"; "Collard Greens"; "Swimming Pools (Drank)"; "Backseat Freestyle"; "Loyalty"; "XXX"; "M.A.A.D City"; "Money Trees"; "Pride"; "Alright"; "Humble"; "Bitch, Don't Kill My Vibe" (remix)
August 29, 2018	Glasgow Summer Sessions	Glasgow	Scotland	"DNA"; "Element"; "Big Shot"; "King Kunta" (with elements of "Yah"); "Goosebumps"; "New Freezer"; "Collard Greens"; "Swimming Pools (Drank)"; "Backseat Freestyle"; "Loyalty"; "XXX"; "M.A.A.D City"; "Money Trees"; "Pride"; "Alright"; "Humble"; "Bitch, Don't Kill My Vibe" (remix)
August 31, 2018	Electric Picnic	Stradbally	Ireland	"DNA"; "Element"; "Big Shot"; "King Kunta" (with elements of "Yah"); "Big Shot"; "Goosebumps"; "Collard Greens"; "Swimming Pools (Drank)"; "Backseat Freestyle"; "Loyalty"; "XXX"; "M.A.A.D City"; "Pride"; "Bitch, Don't Kill My Vibe"; "Alright"; "Humble"; "All the Stars"
September 2, 2018	Made in America Festival	Philadelphia	United States	"DNA"; "Element"; "Big Shot"; "King Kunta" (with elements of "Yah"); "Goosebumps"; "New Freezer"; "Collard Greens"; "Swimming Pools (Drank)"; "Backseat Freestyle"; "Love"; "Bitch, Don't Kill My Vibe"; "M.A.A.D City"; "Jealousy" (performed by Bri Steves); "Alright"; "Humble"
September 14, 2018	Grandoozy	Denver	United States	"DNA"; "Element"; "Big Shot"; "King Kunta" (with elements of "Yah"); "Big Shot"; "Goosebumps"; "Collard Greens"; "Swimming Pools (Drank)"; "Backseat Freestyle"; "Loyalty"; "Money Trees"; "XXX"; "M.A.A.D City"; "Love"; "Alright"; "Humble"; "Bitch, Don't Kill My Vibe" (remix)
September 16, 2018	Music Midtown	Atlanta	United States	"DNA"; "Element"; "Big Shot"; "King Kunta" (with elements of "Yah"); "Big Shot"; "Goosebumps"; "Collard Greens"; "Swimming Pools (Drank)"; "Backseat Freestyle"; "Loyalty"; "Money Trees"; "XXX"; "M.A.A.D City"; "Love"; "Alright"; "Bitch, Don't Kill My Vibe"; "Humble"; "All the Stars"
March 29, 2019	Lollapalooza Chile	Santiago	Chile	"DNA"; "Element"; "Big Shot"; "King Kunta" (with elements of "Yah"); "Big Shot"; "Goosebumps"; "Collard Greens"; "Swimming Pools (Drank)"; "Backseat Freestyle"; "Loyalty"; "Lust"; "Money Trees"; "XXX"; "M.A.A.D City" (first verse); "Pride"; "Love"; "Bitch, Don't Kill My Vibe" (remix); "Alright"; "Humble"; "All the Stars"
March 31, 2019	Lollapalooza Argentina	San Isidro	Argentina	"DNA"; "Element"; "Big Shot"; "King Kunta" (with elements of "Yah"); "Big Shot"; "Goosebumps"; "Collard Greens"; "Swimming Pools (Drank)"; "Backseat Freestyle"; "Loyalty"; "Lust"; "Money Trees"; "XXX"; "M.A.A.D City" (first verse); "Pride"; "Love"; "Bitch, Don't Kill My Vibe" (remix); "Alright"; "Humble"; "All the Stars"
April 5, 2019	Festival Estéreo Picnic	Bogotá	Colombia	"DNA"; "Element"; "Big Shot"; "King Kunta" (with elements of "Yah"); "Big Shot"; "Goosebumps"; "Collard Greens"; "Swimming Pools (Drank)"; "Backseat Freestyle"; "Loyalty"; "Lust"; "Money Trees"; "XXX"; "M.A.A.D City" (first verse); "Pride"; "Love"; "Bitch, Don't Kill My Vibe" (remix); "Alright"; "Humble"; "All the Stars"
April 7, 2019	Lollapalooza Brazil	São Paulo	Brazil	"DNA"; "Element"; "Big Shot"; "King Kunta" (with elements of "Yah"); "Big Shot"; "Goosebumps"; "Collard Greens"; "Swimming Pools (Drank)"; "Backseat Freestyle"; "Loyalty"; "Lust"; "Money Trees"; "XXX"; "M.A.A.D City" (first verse); "Pride"; "Love"; "Bitch, Don't Kill My Vibe" (remix); "Alright"; "Humble"; "All the Stars"
November 3, 2019	Day N Vegas	Las Vegas	United States	"DNA"; "Element"; "Big Shot"; "King Kunta" (with elements of "Yah"); "Big Shot"; "Goosebumps"; "Collard Greens"; "Swimming Pools (Drank)"; "Backseat Freestyle"; "Loyalty"; "Money Trees"; "Hair Down" (with Sir); "XXX"; "M.A.A.D City"; "Pride"; "Love"; "Bitch, Don't Kill My Vibe"; "Alright"; "Humble"
November 12, 2021	Day N Vegas	Las Vegas	United States	"Fuck Your Ethnicity"; "A.D.H.D"; "HiiiPower"; "Hol' Up"; "Chapter Ten"; "Ronald Reagan Era (His Evils)"; "Money Trees"; "Backseat Freestyle"; "Swimming Pools (Drank)"; "Poetic Justice"; "Bitch, Don't Kill My Vibe"; "M.A.A.D City"; "King Kunta"; "I"; "Alright"; "Institutionalized"; "The Blacker the Berry"; "DNA"; "Element"; "Loyalty"; "Humble"; "Family Ties" (with Baby Keem); "Range Brothers" (with Baby Keem); "Love"; "Sing About Me, I'm Dying of Thirst"
June 23, 2022	Milano Summer Festival	Milan	Italy	"United in Grief"; "M.A.A.D City"; "Money Trees"; "Backseat Freestyle"; "Swimming Pools (Drank)"; "Poetic Justice"; "Bitch, Don't Kill My Vibe" (remix); "N95"; "Count Me Out"; "King Kunta"; "I"; "Alright"; "Institutionalized"; "The Blacker the Berry"; "DNA"; "Element"; "Silent Hill"; "Loyalty"; "Humble"; "Love"; "Savior"
June 26, 2022	Glastonbury Festival	Pilton	England	"United in Grief"; "M.A.A.D City"; "Money Trees"; "Backseat Freestyle"; "Swimming Pools (Drank)"; "Poetic Justice"; "Bitch, Don't Kill My Vibe" (remix); "N95"; "Count Me Out"; "King Kunta"; "I"; "Alright"; "Institutionalized"; "The Blacker the Berry"; "DNA"; "Element"; "Silent Hill"; "Loyalty"; "Humble"; "Love"; "Savior"
July 24, 2022	Rolling Loud	Miami Gardens	United States	"N95"; "Element"; "Worldwide Steppers"; "Backseat Freestyle"; "Rich Spirit"; "King Kunta"; "Loyalty"; "Humble"; "Count Me Out"; "M.A.A.D City"; "Purple Hearts"; "Alright: "Silent Hill" (with Kodak Black); "Money Trees"; "DNA"; "Family Ties" (with Baby Keem); "Savior"
June 2, 2023	Primavera Sound Barcelona	Sant Adrià de Besòs	Spain	"N95"; "Element"; "A.D.H.D"; "King Kunta"; "Worldwide Steppers"; "Nosetalgia"; "Backseat Freestyle"; "M.A.A.D City"; "Swimming Pools (Drank)"; "Loyalty"; "Purple Hearts"; "DNA"; "Rich Spirit"; "Humble"; "Sidewalks"; "Count Me Out"; "Money Trees"; "Bitch, Don't Kill My Vibe"; "Die Hard"; "Love"; "Alright"; "Family Ties" (with Baby Keem); "Savior"
June 7, 2023	Primavera Sound Porto	Porto	Portugal	"N95"; "Element"; "A.D.H.D"; "King Kunta"; "Worldwide Steppers"; "Nosetalgia"; "Backseat Freestyle"; "M.A.A.D City"; "Swimming Pools (Drank)"; "Loyalty"; "Purple Hearts"; "DNA"; "Rich Spirit"; "Humble"; "Sidewalks"; "Count Me Out"; "Money Trees"; "Bitch, Don't Kill My Vibe"; "Die Hard"; "Love"; "Alright"; "Family Ties" (with Baby Keem); "Savior"
June 9, 2023	Primavera Sound Madrid	Madrid	Spain	"N95"; "Element"; "A.D.H.D"; "King Kunta"; "Worldwide Steppers"; "Nosetalgia"; "Backseat Freestyle"; "M.A.A.D City"; "Swimming Pools (Drank)"; "Loyalty"; "Purple Hearts"; "DNA"; "Rich Spirit"; "Humble"; "Sidewalks"; "Count Me Out"; "Money Trees"; "Bitch, Don't Kill My Vibe"; "Die Hard"; "Love"; "Alright"; "Family Ties" (with Baby Keem); "Savior"
June 11, 2023	Governors Ball Music Festival	New York City	United States	"N95"; "Element"; "A.D.H.D"; "King Kunta"; "Worldwide Steppers"; "Nosetalgia"; "Backseat Freestyle"; "M.A.A.D City"; "Swimming Pools (Drank)"; "Loyalty"; "Purple Hearts"; "DNA"; "Rich Spirit"; "Humble"; "Sidewalks"; "Count Me Out"; "Money Trees"; "Bitch, Don't Kill My Vibe"; "Die Hard"; "Love"; "Alright"; "Family Ties" (with Baby Keem); "Savior"
June 16, 2023	Bonnaroo Music and Arts Festival	Manchester	United States	"N95"; "Element"; "A.D.H.D"; "King Kunta"; "Worldwide Steppers"; "Nosetalgia"; "Backseat Freestyle"; "M.A.A.D City"; "Swimming Pools (Drank)"; "Loyalty"; "Purple Hearts"; "DNA"; "Rich Spirit"; "Humble"; "Sidewalks"; "Count Me Out"; "Money Trees"; "Bitch, Don't Kill My Vibe"; "Die Hard"; "Love"; "Alright"; "Family Ties" (with Baby Keem); "Savior"
June 28, 2023	Roskilde Festival	Roskilde	Denmark	"N95"; "Element"; "A.D.H.D"; "King Kunta"; "Worldwide Steppers"; "Nosetalgia"; "Backseat Freestyle"; "Swimming Pools (Drank)"; "M.A.A.D City"; "DNA"; "Sidewalks"; "Rich Spirit"; "Humble"; "Loyalty"; "Count Me Out"; "Money Trees"; "Bitch, Don't Kill My Vibe" (remix); "Die Hard"; "Love"; "Alright"; "Savior"
June 29, 2023	Splash!	Gräfenhainichen	Germany	"N95"; "Element"; "A.D.H.D"; "King Kunta"; "Worldwide Steppers"; "Nosetalgia"; "Backseat Freestyle"; "Swimming Pools (Drank)"; "M.A.A.D City"; "DNA"; "Sidewalks"; "Rich Spirit"; "Humble"; "Loyalty"; "Count Me Out"; "Money Trees"; "Bitch, Don't Kill My Vibe" (remix); "Die Hard"; "Love"; "Alright"; "Savior"
June 30, 2023	Rolling Loud Rotterdam	Rotterdam	Netherlands	"N95"; "Element"; "A.D.H.D"; "King Kunta"; "Worldwide Steppers"; "Nosetalgia"; "Backseat Freestyle"; "Swimming Pools (Drank)"; "M.A.A.D City"; "DNA"; "Sidewalks"; "Rich Spirit"; "Humble"; "Loyalty"; "Count Me Out"; "Money Trees"; "Bitch, Don't Kill My Vibe" (remix); "Die Hard"; "Love"; "Alright"; "Savior"
July 1, 2023	Open'er Festival	Gdynia	Poland	"N95"; "Element"; "A.D.H.D"; "King Kunta"; "Worldwide Steppers"; "Nosetalgia"; "Backseat Freestyle"; "Swimming Pools (Drank)"; "M.A.A.D City"; "DNA"; "Sidewalks"; "Rich Spirit"; "Humble"; "Loyalty"; "Count Me Out"; "Money Trees"; "Bitch, Don't Kill My Vibe" (remix); "Die Hard"; "Love"; "Alright"; "Savior"
July 6, 2023	Les Ardentes	Liège	Belgium	"N95"; "Element"; "A.D.H.D"; "King Kunta"; "Worldwide Steppers"; "Nosetalgia"; "Backseat Freestyle"; "Swimming Pools (Drank)"; "M.A.A.D City"; "DNA"; "Sidewalks"; "Rich Spirit"; "Humble"; "Loyalty"; "Count Me Out"; "Money Trees"; "Bitch, Don't Kill My Vibe" (remix); "Die Hard"; "Love"; "Alright"; "Savior"
July 7, 2023	Openair Frauenfeld	Frauenfeld	Switzerland	"N95"; "Element"; "A.D.H.D"; "King Kunta"; "Worldwide Steppers"; "Nosetalgia"; "Backseat Freestyle"; "Swimming Pools (Drank)"; "M.A.A.D City"; "DNA"; "Sidewalks"; "Rich Spirit"; "Humble"; "Loyalty"; "Count Me Out"; "Money Trees"; "Bitch, Don't Kill My Vibe" (remix); "Die Hard"; "Love"; "Alright"; "Savior"
July 8, 2023	Rolling Loud Germany	Munich	Germany	"N95"; "Element"; "A.D.H.D"; "King Kunta"; "Worldwide Steppers"; "Nosetalgia"; "Backseat Freestyle"; "Swimming Pools (Drank)"; "M.A.A.D City"; "DNA"; "Sidewalks"; "Rich Spirit"; "Humble"; "Loyalty"; "Count Me Out"; "Money Trees"; "Bitch, Don't Kill My Vibe" (remix); "Die Hard"; "Love"; "Alright"; "Savior"
July 23, 2023	Lollapalooza Paris	Paris	France	"N95"; "Element"; "A.D.H.D"; "King Kunta"; "Worldwide Steppers"; "Nosetalgia"; "Backseat Freestyle"; "Swimming Pools (Drank)"; "M.A.A.D City"; "DNA"; "Sidewalks"; "Rich Spirit"; "Humble"; "Loyalty"; "Count Me Out"; "Money Trees"; "Bitch, Don't Kill My Vibe" (remix); "Die Hard"; "Love"; "Alright"; "Savior"
August 4, 2023	Lollapalooza	Chicago	United States	"N95"; "Element"; "A.D.H.D"; "King Kunta"; "Worldwide Steppers"; "Nosetalgia"; "Backseat Freestyle"; "Swimming Pools (Drank)"; "M.A.A.D City"; "DNA"; "Sidewalks"; "Rich Spirit"; "Humble"; "Loyalty"; "Count Me Out"; "Money Trees"; "Bitch, Don't Kill My Vibe" (remix); "Die Hard"; "Love"; "Alright"; "Savior"
August 6, 2023	Osheaga Festival	Montreal	Canada	"N95"; "Element"; "A.D.H.D"; "King Kunta"; "Worldwide Steppers"; "Nosetalgia"; "Backseat Freestyle"; "Swimming Pools (Drank)"; "M.A.A.D City"; "DNA"; "Sidewalks"; "Rich Spirit"; "Humble"; "Loyalty"; "Count Me Out"; "Money Trees"; "Bitch, Don't Kill My Vibe" (remix); "Die Hard"; "Love"; "Alright"; "Savior"
August 11, 2023	Outside Lands Music and Arts Festival	San Francisco	United States	"N95"; "Element"; "A.D.H.D"; "King Kunta"; "Worldwide Steppers"; "Nosetalgia"; "Backseat Freestyle"; "Swimming Pools (Drank)"; "M.A.A.D City"; "DNA"; "Sidewalks"; "Rich Spirit"; "Humble"; "Loyalty"; "Count Me Out"; "Money Trees"; "Bitch, Don't Kill My Vibe" (remix); "Die Hard"; "Love"; "Alright"; "Savior"
August 19, 2023	Summer Sonic Festival	Osaka	Japan	"N95"; "Element"; "A.D.H.D"; "King Kunta"; "Worldwide Steppers"; "Nosetalgia"; "Backseat Freestyle"; "Swimming Pools (Drank)"; "M.A.A.D City"; "DNA"; "Sidewalks"; "Rich Spirit"; "Humble"; "Loyalty"; "Count Me Out"; "Money Trees"; "Bitch, Don't Kill My Vibe" (remix); "Die Hard"; "Love"; "Alright"; "Savior"
August 20, 2023	Summer Sonic Festival	Chiba	Japan	"N95"; "Element"; "A.D.H.D"; "King Kunta"; "Worldwide Steppers"; "Nosetalgia"; "Backseat Freestyle"; "Swimming Pools (Drank)"; "M.A.A.D City"; "DNA"; "Sidewalks"; "Rich Spirit"; "Humble"; "Loyalty"; "Count Me Out"; "Money Trees"; "Bitch, Don't Kill My Vibe" (remix); "Die Hard"; "Love"; "Alright"; "Savior"
September 23, 2023	Life Is Beautiful Music & Art Festival	Las Vegas	United States	"N95"; "Element"; "A.D.H.D"; "King Kunta"; "Worldwide Steppers"; "Nosetalgia"; "Backseat Freestyle"; "Swimming Pools (Drank)"; "M.A.A.D City"; "DNA"; "Sidewalks"; "Rich Spirit"; "Humble"; "Loyalty"; "Count Me Out"; "Money Trees"; "Bitch, Don't Kill My Vibe" (remix); "Die Hard"; "Love"; "Alright"; "Savior"
October 6, 2023	Austin City Limits Music Festival	Austin	United States	"N95"; "Element"; "A.D.H.D" (intro); "King Kunta"; "Backseat Freestyle"; "Swimming Pools (Drank)" (shortened); "M.A.A.D City" (first verse); "DNA"; "Humble"; "Money Trees"; "Alright"
October 13, 2023	Austin City Limits Music Festival	Austin	United States	"N95"; "Element"; "A.D.H.D"; "King Kunta"; "Worldwide Steppers"; "Nosetalgia"; "Backseat Freestyle"; "Swimming Pools (Drank)"; "M.A.A.D City"; "DNA"; "Sidewalks"; "Rich Spirit"; "Humble"; "Loyalty"; "Count Me Out"; "Money Trees"; "Bitch, Don't Kill My Vibe" (remix); "Die Hard"; "Love"; "Alright"; "Savior"
October 29, 2023	ONE Musicfest	Atlanta	United States	"N95"; "Element"; "A.D.H.D"; "King Kunta"; "Worldwide Steppers"; "Nosetalgia"; "Backseat Freestyle"; "Swimming Pools (Drank)"; "M.A.A.D City"; "DNA"; "Sidewalks"; "Rich Spirit"; "Humble"; "Loyalty"; "Count Me Out"; "Money Trees"; "Bitch, Don't Kill My Vibe" (remix); "Die Hard"; "Love"; "Alright"; "Savior"
December 9, 2023	Hey Neighbour Festival	Pretoria	South Africa	"N95"; "Element"; "A.D.H.D"; "King Kunta"; "Worldwide Steppers"; "Nosetalgia"; "Backseat Freestyle"; "Swimming Pools (Drank)"; "M.A.A.D City"; "DNA"; "Sidewalks"; "Rich Spirit"; "Humble"; "Loyalty"; "Count Me Out"; "Money Trees"; "Bitch, Don't Kill My Vibe" (remix); "Die Hard"; "Love"; "Alright"; "Savior"
March 23, 2024	AXE Ceremonia	Mexico City	Mexico	"N95"; "Element"; "A.D.H.D"; "King Kunta"; "Worldwide Steppers"; "Nosetalgia"; "Backseat Freestyle"; "Swimming Pools (Drank)"; "M.A.A.D City"; "DNA"; "Sidewalks"; "Rich Spirit"; "Humble"; "Loyalty"; "Count Me Out"; "Money Trees"; "Bitch, Don't Kill My Vibe" (remix); "Die Hard"; "Love"; "Alright"; "Savior"
December 6, 2025	Spilt Milk	Ballarat	Australia	
December 7, 2025	Spilt Milk	Perth	Australia	
December 13, 2025	Spilt Milk	Canberra	Australia	
December 4, 2025	Spilt Milk	Gold Coast	Australia	

== Award shows ==
Date	Event	City	Country	Performed song(s)	Ref.
October 11, 2011	2011 BET Hip Hop Awards	Atlanta	United States	Cypher 1 (with Big K.R.I.T., Tech N9ne, Machine Gun Kelly, and B.o.B)	
October 9, 2012	2012 BET Hip Hop Awards	Atlanta	United States	"Swimming Pools (Drank)"; "The Recipe"	
June 30, 2013	2013 BET Awards	Los Angeles	United States	"M.A.A.D City" / "Bitch, Don't Kill My Vibe" (with Erykah Badu)	
October 15, 2013	2013 BET Hip Hop Awards	Atlanta	United States	Cypher 5 (with Schoolboy Q, Jay Rock, Ab-Soul, and Isaiah Rashad)	
November 24, 2013	2013 American Music Awards	Los Angeles	United States	"Swimming Pools (Drank)"; "Poetic Justice"	
January 26, 2014	56th Annual Grammy Awards	Los Angeles	United States	"Radioactive" / "M.A.A.D City" (with Imagine Dragons)	
May 1, 2014	2014 iHeartRadio Music Awards	Los Angeles	United States	"California Love" (Tupac cover); "M.A.A.D City"	
June 28, 2015	2015 BET Awards	Los Angeles	United States	"Alright"	
February 15, 2016	58th Annual Grammy Awards	Los Angeles	United States	"The Blacker the Berry"; "Alright"; "Untitled 05 | 09.21.2014."	
June 26, 2016	2016 BET Awards	Los Angeles	United States	"Freedom" (with Beyoncé)	
June 25, 2017	2017 BET Awards	Los Angeles	United States	"Mask Off" (remix; with Future)	
January 28, 2018	60th Annual Grammy Awards	New York City	United States	"XXX"; "DNA"; "Big Shot"; "New Freezer"; "King's Dead" (performance narrated by Dave Chappelle; "XXX" performed with U2)	
February 21, 2018	2018 Brit Awards	London	England	"Feel"; "New Freezer" (with Rich the Kid)	

== Television shows and specials ==
Date	Event	City	Country	Performed song(s)	Ref.
January 26, 2013	Saturday Night Live	New York City	United States	"Swimming Pools (Drank)"; "Poetic Justice"	
February 6, 2013	De Wereld Draait Door	Amsterdam	The Netherlands	"Swimming Pools (Drank)"	
September 17, 2013	The Arsenio Hall Show	Los Angeles	United States	"M.A.A.D City"; "Collard Greens" (with Schoolboy Q)	
February 2, 2014	Saturday Night Live	New York City	United States	"Radioactive" (remix; with Imagine Dragons)	
November 15, 2014	Saturday Night Live	New York City	United States	"I"; "Pay for It" (with Jay Rock and Chantal Kreviazuk)	
December 16, 2014	The Colbert Report	New York City	United States	"Untitled 03 | 05.28.2013."	
May 27, 2015	The Ellen DeGeneres Show	Burbank	United States	"These Walls"	
September 9, 2015	The Late Show with Stephen Colbert	New York City	United States	To Pimp a Butterfly Medley: 1. "Wesley's Theory"; 2. "Momma"; 3. "King Kunta"; 4. "U"	
January 7, 2016	The Tonight Show Starring Jimmy Fallon	New York City	United States	"Untitled 08 | 09.06.2014." (with elements of "Untitled 02 | 06.23.2014."; originally titled as "Untitled 2")	
January 8, 2018	ESPN at College Football Playoff National Championship	Atlanta	United States	"DNA"; "Element"; "Humble"; "All the Stars"	
December 2, 2018	Saturday Night Live	New York City	United States	"Tints" (with Anderson .Paak)	
February 13, 2022	Super Bowl LVI halftime show	Inglewood	United States	"M.A.A.D City"; "Alright"; "Forgot About Dre" (Dr. Dre cover; with Eminem)	
October 1, 2022	Saturday Night Live	New York City	United States	"Rich Spirit" / "N95"; "Father Time" (with Sampha)	
February 9, 2025	Super Bowl LIX halftime show	New Orleans	United States	"Bodies" (unreleased GNX track); "Squabble Up"; "Humble"; "DNA"; "Euphoria"; "Man at the Garden"; "Peekaboo"; "Luther" (with SZA); "All the Stars" (with SZA); "Not Like Us"; "TV Off" (with Mustard)	
