= Untitled Unmastered =

2016 compilation album by Kendrick Lamar

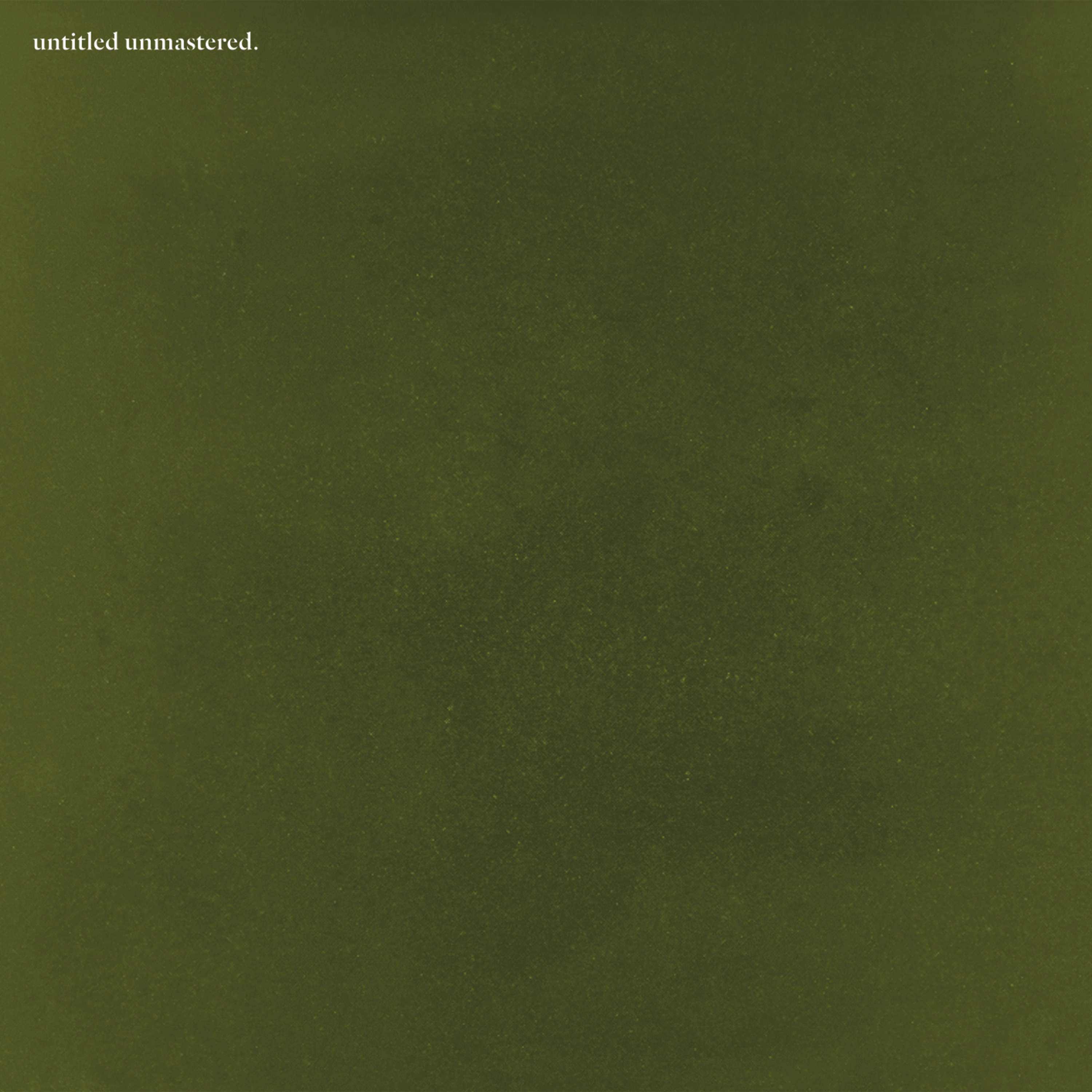

Compilation album by Kendrick Lamar
- Released: March 4, 2016
- Recorded: 2013–2014; 2016
- Genres: Jazz rap; funk; jazz; soul
- Length: 34:06
- Labels: TDE; Aftermath; Interscope
- Producers: Astronote; Cardo; Egypt; Frank Dukes; Kendrick Lamar; Terrace Martin; Mono/Poly; Ali Shaheed Muhammad; Ritz Reynolds; Sounwave; Thundercat; Swizz Beatz; Adrian Younge; Yung Exclusive

Kendrick Lamar chronology
To Pimp a Butterfly (2015)	Untitled Unmastered (2016)	Damn (2017)

Singles from Untitled Unmastered
- 1. "Untitled 07 | Levitate" Released: March 23, 2016

Untitled Unmastered (stylized as untitled unmastered.) is a compilation album by American rapper Kendrick Lamar. It was released on March 4, 2016, through Top Dawg Entertainment, Aftermath Entertainment and Interscope Records. The album was produced by Lamar himself, alongside Cardo, Frank Dukes, Terrace Martin, Sounwave, Thundercat, Swizz Beatz, and others. The album additionally contains guest appearances from Thundercat, Top Dawg labelmates Lance Skiiiwalker (as Rocket), SZA, Punch, and Jay Rock, as well as Anna Wise, Bilal, and CeeLo Green.

A jazz rap album, it consists of previously unreleased demos that originated during the recording of Lamar's third studio album To Pimp a Butterfly (2015). It continues the latter's use of politically charged themes based on race, identity, sexuality, and spirituality, as well as its experimentation with funk, jazz, and soul music. Untitled Unmastered was worked on between 2013 and 2016, mostly during the sessions for To Pimp a Butterfly in late 2014. Lamar left the album unmastered in favor of preserving an authentic sound.

During its production, Lamar performed untitled tracks on The Colbert Report in 2014, The Tonight Show Starring Jimmy Fallon, and the Grammy Awards in 2016. In the latter year, there became speculations about a new project from Lamar, in which LeBron James encouraged Top Dogg label head Anthony Tiffith to release it. The album lacked a traditional promotion schedule and "Untitled 07" was released under the title "Untitled 07 | Levitate" as its sole single on March 23, 2016.

Upon its release, Untitled Unmastered received acclaim from music critics for its unconventional production and Lamar's writing, with some complimenting as a direct follow-up to To Pimp a Butterfly. Commercially, the album debuted at number one on the Billboard 200, earning 178,000 album-equivalent units. In addition, it topped the US Top R&B/Hip-Hop Albums charts. Untitled Unmastered appeared in album charts from various countries, particularly being successful in Canada, Denmark, the United Kingdom, Australia and New Zealand.

== Background ==
In December 2014, Lamar performed an untitled track with Thundercat, Bilal, Terrace Martin, and Anna Wise as a musical guest on The Colbert Report. Around the time his album To Pimp a Butterfly (2015) was released, Lamar revealed on The Breakfast Club that he recorded "about 30 to 40 songs that we actually fought over in the studio", adding that some tracks were left off the album to make it more concise. When asked about what happened with the unreleased music, Lamar responded that he would still play and perform these tracks.

In January 2016, he performed another untitled track on The Tonight Show Starring Jimmy Fallon. Following his acclaimed performance at the 2016 Grammy Awards, which incorporated elements of another new untitled track, Lamar revealed that he had a substantial body of material left over from the To Pimp a Butterfly (2015) sessions. He explained that various factors, including sample clearance issues and timing constraints, prevented some songs he valued from being included on the album.

== Recording and production ==
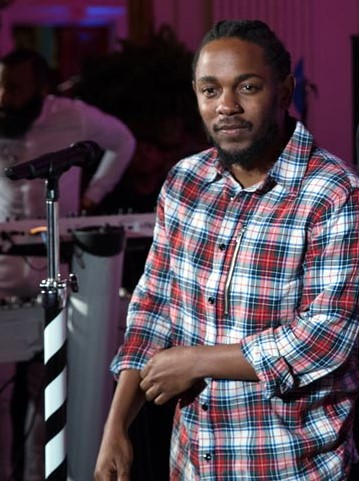
Lamar, wanting to keep a fully authentic sound for Untitled Unmastered, decided to leave its tracks unmastered.

Material performed during several of Lamar's televised appearances was later incorporated into Untitled Unmastered. His performance on The Colbert Report featured "Untitled 03" with an added coda, while his set on The Tonight Show included "Untitled 08" along with the closing portion of "Untitled 02". Elements of "Untitled 05" were also used during his performance at the 2016 Grammy Awards. Prior to its official release, the Tonight Show performance circulated under the informal title "Untitled 2". Additionally, a portion of Lamar's verse from "Untitled 08" had previously appeared in remixes of Funkadelic's song "Ain’t That Funkin’ Kinda Hard on You" (2014). The majority of the album was recorded during the sessions for To Pimp a Butterfly in late 2014.

Thundercat and Martin serve as prominent contributors to Untitled Unmastered. The former played bass on three tracks, produced two tracks, provided additional production on "Untitled 02", and additional vocals on "Untitled 08". The latter provided saxophone and additional keys on "Untitled 02", keys on "Untitled 04", and produced "Untitled 05". Producer Swizz Beatz revealed that his and Alicia Keys' son Egypt, then five years old, contributed to the production of "Untitled 07" and also played a significant role in shaping "untitled 01" and "untitled 02" through the use of uncredited samples. TDE producer Sounwave also confirmed that Egypt was responsible for producing the latter half of "Untitled 07". The track "untitled 06 | 06.30.2014" features uncredited vocals from CeeLo Green and was produced by Adrian Younge and Ali Shaheed Muhammad of A Tribe Called Quest.

According to rapper Punch, he and Kendrick discussed about making a project in an approach similar to Prince's The Black Album (1994), which lacked an album cover and track titles. In an interview with Complex, Sounwave explained that Lamar chose not to master the recordings, aiming to preserve a fully authentic sound. Writing for The Independent, Christopher Hooton suggested that, despite differing from Lamar's previous studio albums Good Kid, M.A.A.D City (2012) and To Pimp a Butterfly, he compared album to Kanye West's The Life of Pablo (2016) for both reflecting the internet's "transient nature" and how they could be updated and re-worked at any time. There were no credits on the liner notes of Untitled Unmastered, with Sounwave revealing them via a tweet in April 2016. The rest of producers involved on the album include Astronote, Cardo, Frank Dukes, Mono/Poly, Ritz Reynolds, and Yung Exclusive.

== Music and lyrics ==
=== Overview ===
Untitled Unmastered is a jazz rap, jazz, funk, and soul album. Spanning 34 minutes, It features eight untitled tracks only labeled by their numerical positions on the album as well as dates, with each song being in the format "untitled [numerical position] | [date]". The dates indicate that these tracks were written and recorded at various points between 2013 and 2016. With an experimental structure and spoken-word parts, Untitled Unmastered addresses politically charged themes based on race, identity, sexuality, and spirituality similar to To Pimp a Butterfly.

Untitled Unmastered serves as a project that goes beyond conventional album constraints and a proper narrative. The album's tracks usually feature "upright bass, skittering drums and horn textures" along with samples. Stylistically, they range from studio demos to developed, cohesive tracks that were cutoff from To Pimp a Butterfly. Throughout Untitled Unmastered, additional vocalists are often featured throughout the album, including SZA, Green, and Wise, to compliment Lamar's dense rhymes. The intermittent phrase "Pimp pimp... Hooray!" appears throughout Untitled Unmastered, serving as a part-celebratory, part-ironic congregation chant.

Despite being titled as "unfinished", critics consider the album be a cohesive and developed project. Evan Rytlewski of The A.V. Club stated that while some of the tracks that debuted on television were slightly tweaked, they shared the "sumptuous, live-in-the-studio jazz odyssey" as To Pimp a Butterfly. The Line of Best Fit writer Grant Rindner compared the former album's emphasis on guest contributions to Donnie Trumper and the Social Experiment's album Surf (2015). In addition, the Guardian's Alex Macpherson considered Untitled Unmastered to be a looser version of To Pimp a Butterfly.

=== Tracks 1–4 ===
"Untitled 01"
"Untitled 01" depicts Lamar's spiritual perspective of an apocalypse involving human extinction and a lack of morality.

The opening track, "Untitled 01", begins with a spoken intro from Bilal before evolving into an apocalyptic theme. Writing from a spiritual perspective, Lamar expresses his frustrations and concerts about human extinction and a widespread lack of morality. He visualizes a world crisis involving wars, discrimination, and superficiality, while seeking a path to relief. Hugh Leask of Clash described the musical style of "Untitled 01" as balancing a piano loop and unsettling synths with a pounding drumbeat and double-bass rhythm. "Untitled 02" expands on the album's spiritual themes, highlighted by Lamar's yell to "Get God on the phone!". Over an atmospheric trap beat, he uses a sing-rap delivery, shifting vocal pitches, and a flow similar to Drake while mocking him. Lamar confronts racial perceptions of Black people living in poverty while criticizing contemporary rappers who exploit the issue. Sonically, the track relies on echoed vocals, "nightmarish" synths, and sudden uses of horns and keys.

Driven by a funk influence, flutes, and a layered chorus of voices, "Untitled 03" balances racial themes with both serious and humorous intent. Lamar evaluates the perceived strengths and weaknesses of four distinct racial groups by narrating interactions with one from each different background. He characterizes Black people through falling into lust, Asians through Eastern philosophy, and Native Americans through their connection to land. However, Lamar's dialogue with the "white man" centers on exploitation, specifically critiquing "being sold for $10.99". "Untitled 03" features a hook from Bilal and recurring vocals from Wise, beginning with "What did the Asian say?". The shortest track on the album, "Untitled 04" features singer SZA crooning on the track, where she sings "head is the answer" with Lamar. With "conspiratorial whispers", the track emphasizes a pro-education message.

=== Tracks 5–8 ===
"Untitled 05"
Influenced by jazz and downtempo, "Untitled 05" shows Lamar's aggressive flow and he raps from the perspective of a spiritually troubled outsider.

"Untitled 08"
An upbeat G-funk song produced by Thundercat, "Untitled 08" shows Lamar rapping about how success doesn't always guarantee personal happiness.

Emphasized by a jazz style, downtempo influence, and an Amen break, "Untitled 05" explores feelings of hopelessness over prominent bass and saxophone lines. Lamar opens his verse with a reference of Gunplay's track "Bible on the Dash", mimicking his "hoarse" delivery. He raps aggressively from the perspective of an outsider who formerly attended church and spoke to God. The character realizes that only "hollow tips" remain before murdering a rival. The track also features verses from Punch and Jay Rock. A lighter track with flutes, xylophones, and a bossa nova style, "Untitled 06" centers on "radical" self-love and features a chorus from CeeLo Green. Lyrically, Lamar attempts to impress a woman while being affected by self-doubt and showing his flaws.

Described as an eight-minute, three-part track, "Untitled 07" features a battle-centric verse from Lamar and a recurring "levitate" chant. Lyrically, Lamar goes from taunting peers to boasting about his impact and spending habits. He also targets his own ego after taking aim at Jay Electronica's output with the line "I could neve rend a career if it never start". It is instrumentally build on saxophone assists and a piano-driven beat, In the conclusion, "Untitled 07" directly links back to "Untitled 04" by using the refrain, "head is the answer". Also known as "Blue Faces", "Untitled 08" is a G-funk track featuring "squirmy" synths. Despite being more upbeat than usual, Lamar expresses his feelings of anger while exploring themes of spirituality, materialism, and racial profiling. He addresses how success doesn't always guarantee personal happiness.

== Promotion and release ==
Untitled Unmastered lacked a formal promotion schedule. Speculation about a new project grew after hints from Top Dawg Entertainment, along with public encouragement from LeBron James directed at label head Anthony Tiffith to issue Lamar's untitled recordings. On March 4, 2016, Untitled Unmastered was released to digital service providers and digital download. Later that day, Lamar confirmed that the tracks were unfinished demos from To Pimp a Butterfly. In an interview with Spin, Wise revealed that she had been aware of the compilation for some time prior to its release and had been asked to keep its existence confidential. However, CeeLo Green and Thundercat had both been unaware of the project until close to its release. The former felt that "Untitled 06" was "never really a complete song" as it had been finished without his involvement. The latter was unaware of the album until about a day prior to its release. Untitled Unmastered was released on CD on March 11, followed by an edited version the next week. On March 23, "Untitled 07" was released as the album's lone single under the title ""Untitled 07 | Levitate".

== Critical reception ==
Professional ratings
Aggregate scores
Source	Rating
AnyDecentMusic?	8.2/10
Metacritic	86/100
Review scores
Source	Rating
AllMusic	4/5 stars
The A.V. Club	A−
Chicago Tribune	3.5/4 stars
The Guardian	4/5 stars
NME	4/5
Paste	9.0/10
Pitchfork	8.6/10
Rolling Stone	3.5/5 stars
Spin	8/10
Vice (Expert Witness)	A−

Untitled Unmastered received acclaim from music critics. At Metacritic, which assigns a normalized rating out of 100 to reviews from mainstream publications, the album received an average score of 86, based on 31 reviews. Music critics praised the album's musical structure and noted that it showcased Lamar's artistry. AllMusic reviewer Andy Kellman considered Untitled Unmastered to be as lyrically and musically equivalent as To Pimp a Butterfly, in which he wrote that the presence of many contributors was "unmistakable". He considered it to be "no mere offcut dump", comparing the album favorably to Lamar's other projects. Evan Rytlewski of the A.V. Club argued that the former stands on its own merits rather than being considered leftovers, showcasing a strong example of Lamar "working at peak creativity." He added that the album deserved to be "analyzed and debated" while also being enjoyed at the same time. The Line of Best Fit reviewer Grant Rindner considered the tracks from Untitled Unmastered to be "equally fascinating" and "sonically developed". He added that listeners who expected Untitled Unmastered to share the same cultural impact of To Pimp a Butterfly were "depriving themselves of one of the year's early musical gems."

Some music critics noted that the album helped build Lamar's reputation in hip-hop and expand his artistry. XXL writer Preezy praised the project as a "victory lap" that solidified Lamar's artistic dominance in hip-hop, considering to be the best album of the genre by that point. He also connected its themes of spirituality to James Redfield's novel The Celestine Prophecy (1993). In addition, he compares the album favorably to Nas' The Lost Tapes (2002), which featured tracks that were removed from his double-album I Am... (1999). In a review for HipHopDX, Andre Grant lauded Untitled Unmastered for its representation of creative freedom for Lamar and his associated musicians involved. For DIY, Dan Owens called the album a "fascinating glance" into Lamar's creative process, stating that it suggests there's more unreleased music from him with consistent high-quality. Clash writer Hugh Leask praised Untitled Unmastered as a "stunningly cohesive and lucid work", stating that its focus stood out from other compilations and archive collections. He added that it reaffirmed Lamar's status one of the most important artists in 2016.

Music critics often analyzed the themes, structure, and musical influences of Untitled Unmastered. Greg Kot of Chicago Tribune observed that the tracks of the album grapple with themes such as race, identity, and self-worth, presenting human experience as fluid and evolving rather than fixed. In NME, Larry Bartleet emphasized the density and nuance of Untitled Unmastered, in which he considered Lamar to be an "artist constantly in motion." Writing for the Guardian, Alex Macpherson suggested that the understated nature of the release allows different aspects of Lamar's abilities to come into focus. Will Hermes of Rolling Stone concluded that even Lamar's scrapped material demonstrates a high level of artistry, with an intimacy that elevates the project beyond a simple compilation for fans. Writing for Tiny Mix Tapes, Brooklyn Russell highlighted the album's contrast "whether rhythmically bustling or meditative", stating that it continues to reflect Lamar's distinctive artistic vision and ambition. In Vice, the Village Voice critic Robert Christgau commented that Untitled Unmastered was "worthwhile, occasionally exciting", considering it to be a "bit of a cheat."

Some music critics stated that the album stood out as a cohesive project while consisting of demos. Kris Ex of Pitchfork labeled Untitled Unmastered as a "small and quiet statement from an artist with little to prove at this moment", contrasting it as a "complete inversion" to Kanye West's The Life of Pablo. Adam Kivel of Consequence saw Lamar's contributions as "intentional and powerful" in demo standards, seeing Untitled Unmastered as a compliment to To Pimp a Butterfly. Chris Dart of Exclaim! labeled it as a "brilliant mini-album" that stands out as an individual project while expanding the themes of To Pimp a Butterfly. Stephen F. Kearse, writing for Paste, considered the project to share Lamar's "what if" version of his own mythology rather than merely being a "collection of B-sides". PopMatters reviewer Kevin Korber noted that the album's surprise release led Lamar to feel less constrained from a fixed narrative, contributing to the album's bursts of frustration and varied thoughts. In the Boston Globe, Julian Benbow noted that, despite lacking the structured narrative of Lamar's previous work, the material remains tightly constructed. While Kellan Miller, writing for Drowned in Sound, considered Untitled Unmastered difficult to listen to fragmentally, he described the project as reflecting Lamar's "brilliance" through his "rough drafts".

== Commercial performance ==
In the United States, Untitled Unmastered debuted at number one on the Billboard 200, earning 178,000 album-equivalent units for the week ending March 26, 2016. 142,000 came from traditional album sales. The album additionally topped the Indie Store Album Sales and Top R&B/Hip-Hop Albums charts. By the end of 2016, the album was positioned at number 82 on the Billboard 200 and number 10 on the Top R&B/Hip-Hop Albums charts. It additionally peaked at number 5 on the Top Rap Albums around that same time. Untitled Unmastered sold 205,000 copies domestically as of April 30, 2016,

In the United Kingdom, the album charted at number 7 on its Official Albums Chart and ultimately peaked at number 2 on the R&B Albums Chart. It also sold 37,059 copies within its first week, and was later certified Silver by the British Phonographic Industry (BPI) after selling a total of 60,000 certified units. In New Zealand, the album charted at number 5 on the New Zealand Albums Chart, and was later certified Gold by Recorded Music NZ (RMNZ) after shipping a total of 7,500 certified units. In Belgium, the album charted at number 12 on the Ultratop chart in Wallonia and peaked at number 11 on the Ultratop chart in Flanders. By the end of 2016, the album was positioned at number 134 on the Ultratop chart in Flanders. The album also topped the Canadian Albums Chart and Danish Albums Chart, and peaked within the top 10 of charts in Australia, the Netherlands, Ireland, Norway, and Switzerland. Additionally, it appeared in charts from Austria, Finland, Germany, Hungary, Portugal, and Sweden.

== Track listing ==
Untitled Unmastered track listing
No.	Title	Writer(s)	Producer(s)	Length
1.	"Untitled 01 | 08.19.2014."	Kendrick Duckworth; Brent Reynolds; Bilal Oliver; Anna Wise	Ritz Reynolds	4:07
2.	"Untitled 02 | 06.23.2014."	Duckworth; Ronald LaTour, Jr.; Daveon Jackson; Stephen Bruner; Brock Korsan	Cardo; Yung Exclusive; Thundercat^{[a]}	4:18
3.	"Untitled 03 | 05.28.2013."	Duckworth; Oliver	Astronote	2:34
4.	"Untitled 04 | 08.14.2014."	Duckworth; Bruner; Mark Spears; Solana Rowe; Lance Howard	Thundercat; Sounwave; Kendrick Lamar	1:50
5.	"Untitled 05 | 09.21.2014."	Duckworth; Spears; Terrace Martin; Wise; Terrence Henderson, Jr.	Sounwave; Terrace Martin	5:38
6.	"Untitled 06 | 06.30.2014."	Duckworth; Adrian Younge; Ali Muhammed; Thomas Callaway	Younge; Ali Shaheed Muhammad	3:28
7.	"Untitled 07 | 2014–2016"	Duckworth; Adam Feeney; Kasseem Dean; LaTour, Jr.; Jackson; Korsan	Frank Dukes; Cardo; Yung Exclusive; Egypt	8:16
8.	"Untitled 08 | 09.06.2014."	Duckworth; Bruner; Charles Dickerson	Thundercat; Mono/Poly	3:55
Total length:				34:06

Notes

- ^{^[a]} signifies an additional producer.
- All tracks stylized in all lowercase letters.

== Personnel ==
Credits are adapted from Sounwave's X post.

- Dominic Angelella – additional keys (track 1)
- Taz Arnold – ending skit (track 7)
- Astronote – production (track 3)
- Joe Baldacci – drums (track 1), drum engineering (track 1)
- Bilal – additional vocals (tracks 1, 3, 5)
- Cardo – production (tracks 2, 7)
- Egypt – production (track 7), additional vocals (track 7)
- Cee Lo – additional vocals (track 6)
- Frank Dukes – production (track 7)
- Jay Rock – verse (track 5)
- Kendrick Lamar – lead artist, production (track 4)
- Josef Leimberg – added trumpet (track 5)
- Mani Strings – additional vocals (track 3)
- Terrace Martin – production (track 5), saxophone (track 2), keys (track 4), additional keys (track 2)
- Mono/Poly – production (track 8)
- Ali Shaheed Muhammad – production (track 6)
- Punch – additional vocals (track 5)
- Ritz Reynolds – production (track 1)
- Rocket – additional vocals (track 4)
- Sounwave – production (tracks 4, 5), added drums (track 1)
- SZA – additional vocals (tracks 4, 5, 7)
- Thundercat – production (tracks 4, 8), additional production (track 2), bass (tracks 2, 5, 7), additional vocals (track 8)
- Anna Wise – additional vocals (tracks 1, 5)
- Adrian Younge – production (track 6)
- Yung Exclusive – production (tracks 2, 7)

== Charts ==
=== Weekly charts ===
Weekly chart performance for Untitled Unmastered
Chart (2016–2024)	Peak position
Australian Albums (ARIA)	3
Austrian Albums (Ö3 Austria)	31
Belgian Albums (Ultratop Flanders)	11
Belgian Albums (Ultratop Wallonia)	12
Canadian Albums (Billboard)	1
Danish Albums (Hitlisten)	1
Dutch Albums (Album Top 100)	9
Finnish Albums (Suomen virallinen lista)	26
French Albums (SNEP)	55
German Albums (Offizielle Top 100)	45
Hungarian Physical Albums (MAHASZ)	19
Irish Albums (IRMA)	9
New Zealand Albums (RMNZ)	5
Norwegian Albums (VG-lista)	7
Portuguese Albums (AFP)	50
Swedish Albums (Sverigetopplistan)	13
Swiss Albums (Schweizer Hitparade)	9
UK Albums (Official Charts)	7
UK R&B Albums (Official Charts)	2
US Billboard 200	1
US Indie Store Album Sales (Billboard)	1
US Top R&B/Hip-Hop Albums (Billboard)	1

=== Year-end charts ===
Year-end chart performance for Untitled Unmastered
Chart (2016)	Position
Belgian Albums (Ultratop Flanders)	134
US Billboard 200	82
US Top R&B/Hip-Hop Albums (Billboard)	10

== Certifications ==
Certifications for Untitled Unmastered
Region	Certification	Certified units/sales
New Zealand (RMNZ)	Gold	7,500^{‡}
United Kingdom (BPI)	Silver	60,000^{‡}
^{‡} Sales+streaming figures based on certification alone.

== See also ==
- List of number-one albums of 2016 (Canada)
- List of Billboard 200 number-one albums of 2016
- List of Billboard number-one R&B/hip-hop albums of 2016
