= These Walls (Kendrick Lamar song) =

Single by Kendrick Lamar featuring Bilal, Anna Wise and Thundercat

from the album To Pimp a Butterfly
- Released: October 13, 2015
- Recorded: 2012–2013
- Genre: Hip-hop; neo soul
- Length: 4:10 (single version); 5:01 (album version)
- Label: TDE; Aftermath; Interscope
- Songwriters: Kendrick Duckworth; Terrace Martin; Larrance Dopson; James Fauntleroy; Rose McKinney
- Producers: Martin; Dopson; Sounwave (addi.)

Kendrick Lamar singles chronology
"Alright" (2015)	"These Walls" (2015)	"untitled 07 | levitate" (2016)

Bilal singles chronology
"Back to Love" (2013)	"These Walls" (2015)

Anna Wise singles chronology
"These Walls" (2015)	"Precious Possession" (2016)

Thundercat singles chronology
"Them Changes" (2015)	"These Walls" (2015)	"Bus in These Streets" (2016)

Music video
- "These Walls" on YouTube

"These Walls" is a song by American rapper Kendrick Lamar featuring fellow American musicians Bilal, Anna Wise, and Thundercat. It was originally released on March 15, 2015 as a track from the former's third studio album To Pimp a Butterfly, before being released as its fifth and final single on October 13, 2015. The track was written alongside James Fauntleroy, Rose McKinney, and producers Terrace Martin and Larrance Dopson, with Sounwave being credited as an additional producer. It won Best Rap/Sung Performance at the 58th Annual Grammy Awards on February 15, 2016.

== Lyrical interpretation ==
Rolling Stone stated the song "teases the dark underbelly of sudden fame and offers a peek at the rapper's life when he hit his lowest points", while Billboard editor Kris Ex wrote that Lamar is "pondering sex and existence in equal measure; it's a yoni metaphor about the power of peace, with sugar walls being escape and real walls being obstacles."

== Music video ==
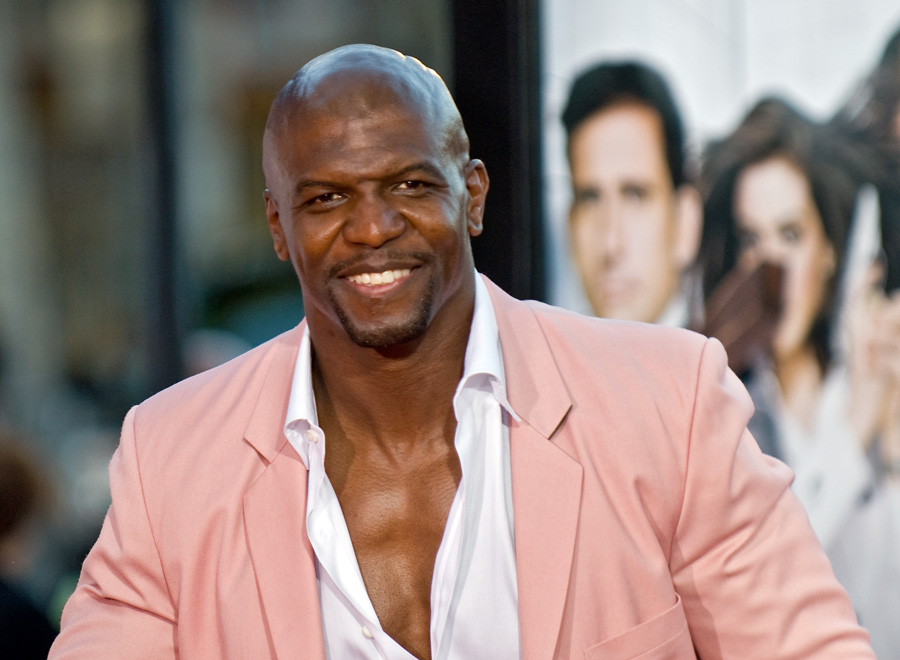
The music video features an appearance by American actor Terry Crews.

The song's music video premiered on October 28, 2015, on Lamar's Vevo account. It was directed by Colin Tilley and The Little Homies. Entitled "Behind the Walls: A Black Comedy", the clip opens in a jail cell with Corey Holcomb and then flashes back to a wild night at an apartment complex – from strippers, to drugs, altercations, and skits. Lamar first appears in his room grinding with a girl while her girlfriends catch it all on camera. He then crashes the stage at a talent show and performs "Hit the Quan" alongside Terry Crews. Meanwhile, Isaiah Rashad gets tied up and seduced in his bedroom, and SZA finds Lamar crashing through her apartment wall. By the end of the night, the cops come calling and Holcomb's character gets arrested. The video ends with "To be continued". For Rap-Up, "the Compton rapper shows his comedic side (and dance moves) in the cinematic clip."

== Live performances ==
On May 27, 2015, Lamar performed the song live on The Ellen DeGeneres Show, complete with a white-clad couple who danced around the stage as a nearby artist painted a portrait of them. "These Walls" was featured on the Kunta's Groove Sessions tour.

== Charts ==
Chart (2015)	Peak position
UK Hip Hop/R&B (Official Charts)	12
US Billboard Hot 100	94
US Hot R&B/Hip-Hop Songs (Billboard)	34

== Certifications ==
Region	Certification	Certified units/sales
Australia (ARIA)	Platinum	70,000^{‡}
Canada (Music Canada)	Gold	40,000^{‡}
New Zealand (RMNZ)	Gold	15,000^{‡}
United Kingdom (BPI)	Silver	200,000^{‡}
^{‡} Sales+streaming figures based on certification alone.
