= Untitled 02 – 06.23.2014. =

"Untitled 02 | 06.23.2014."

Song by Kendrick Lamar

from the album Untitled Unmastered
- Released: March 4, 2016
- Recorded: June 23, 2014
- Genre: Hip-hop; jazz rap; trap
- Length: 4:18
- Label: Top Dawg; Aftermath; Interscope
- Songwriters: Kendrick Duckworth; Ronald LaTour, Jr.; Daveon Jackson; Stephen Bruner; Brock Korsan
- Producers: Cardo; Yung Exclusive; Thundercat (add.)

"Untitled 02 | 06.23.2014." (stylized in all lowercase) is a song by the American rapper Kendrick Lamar, featured on his compilation album, Untitled Unmastered. The song was produced by Cardo and Deveon "Yung Exclusive" Jackson, with additional production from Thundercat.

== Commercial performance ==
On the chart dated March 26, 2016, "Untitled 02 | 06.23.2014." entered the Billboard Hot 100 at number 79, powered by first-week digital download sales of 17,602 copies. The song was the highest charting track from the album.

== Live performances ==
Lamar performed "Untitled 02 | 06.23.2014." at every show on the Damn tour.

== Weekly charts ==
Chart (2016)	Peak position
Australia (ARIA)	71
UK Singles (Official Charts)	57
UK Hip Hop/R&B (Official Charts)	9
US Billboard Hot 100	79
US Hot R&B/Hip-Hop Songs (Billboard)	23
US Hot Rap Songs (Billboard)	12
