= Untitled 08 – 09.06.2014. =

"Untitled 08 | 09.06.2014."

Song by Kendrick Lamar

from the album Untitled Unmastered
- Released: March 4, 2016
- Recorded: September 6, 2014
- Genre: G-funk; jazz rap; alternative hip-hop
- Length: 3:55
- Label: Top Dawg; Aftermath; Interscope
- Songwriters: Kendrick Duckworth; Stephen Bruner; Charles Dickerson
- Producers: Thundercat; Mono/Poly

"Untitled 08 | 09.06.2014." (stylized in all lowercase), titled "Untitled 2" before its official release, is a jazz rap song by American rapper Kendrick Lamar, featured on his compilation album, Untitled Unmastered. It was produced by Thundercat who also provides additional vocals, and Mono/Poly.

== Composition ==
Lyrically, the track discusses the futility of hopelessness in the face of adversity (mashed up with 'untitled 2' for Kendrick's Fallon performance in January). The lyrics show little optimism, though Lamar cushions his anger and disappointment with "irresistibly" feel-good vibes, suggesting there may be hope after all. USA Today described the narrative: "one of a young woman struggling with her come-up, the other an impoverished voice lashing out at Kendrick's own accounts of his struggles. Both stories dissolve into his own, as he ends the album questioning what exactly we're owed by the universe for existing, and how hard we need to fight for what we're not." Musically, critics compared the song with "King Kunta", for its "hydraulic-pumping synthesized bass thump and Lamar's slangy flow".

== Live performances ==
The song was performed for the public for the first time on January 7, 2016, on The Tonight Show Starring Jimmy Fallon.

== Charts ==
Chart (2016)	Peak position
Belgium (Ultratop 50 Flanders)	27
Belgium Airplay (Ultratop Flanders)	48
Belgium Urban (Ultratop Flanders)	16
US Bubbling Under R&B/Hip-Hop Singles (Billboard)	3

== Other versions ==
Lamar originally had the first verse of the track wrote for his feature on a remix of the Funkadelic song "Ain't That Kinda Funkin' Hard on You?" with Ice Cube.

George Clinton said about the song "I hadn't heard those [songs on Untitled Unmastered], but when I did 'Wesley's Theory' we did a trade off. The first verse on 'untitled 08 | 09.06.2014.' was originally written for my song with Louie Vega, 'Ain't That Funkin' Kinda Hard on You?'".
