= Untitled 03 – 05.28.2013. =

"Untitled 03 | 05.28.2013."

Song by Kendrick Lamar

from the album Untitled Unmastered
- Released: March 4, 2016
- Recorded: May 28, 2013
- Genre: Hip-hop; jazz rap; conscious hip-hop
- Length: 2:34
- Label: Top Dawg; Aftermath; Interscope
- Songwriters: Kendrick Duckworth; Bilal Oliver
- Producer: Astronote

"Untitled 03 | 05.28.2013.", titled "Untitled 1" before its official release, is a song by American rapper Kendrick Lamar, featured on his compilation album, Untitled Unmastered (2016). The song features additional vocals from Bilal, who wrote the song alongside Lamar, and Mani Strings, alongside production from Astronote.

Upon its release, "Untitled 03 | 05.28.2013." was positively received by music critics, who praised the song's lyrics and delivery. Commercially, it charted at number 67 on the UK singles chart and number 49 on the US Hot R&B/Hip-Hop Songs chart, ultimately peaking at number 19 on the Sweden Heatseeker chart.

== Composition and lyrics ==
The song, a jazz rap and conscious hip-hop composition, tells a story of four people that give Lamar advice: an Asian, Indian, black and white man, the latter of whom attempts to financially exploit him. Bilal prompts the section for each person. The song also explores the concepts of Afrofuturism and freedom. The original repeated ending line "Tell 'em we don't die, we multiply" has been viewed as a reference to the movie Bebe's Kids (1992) and the N.W.A song "Real Niggaz Don't Die" (1991). This line was removed on the official release, with Consequence reasoning that this was to make the "solution remain vague".

== Critical reception ==
Justin Davis of Complex wrote that Lamar's fast rapping near the end of "Untitled 03 | 05.28.2013." showcased "his outrageous technical skill". He described the song as impactful and reckoned that fans who did not like the single "I" would be "very relieved" by Lamar's return to more jazz-style music. In 2022, Consequence listed "Untitled 03" as Lamar's ninth-best song, complimenting its exploration of the topic of maintaining personal integrity when confronted with tempting rewards from manipulative record executives. Graham Corrigan of Complex listed it as one of his ten favorite songs of 2016.

== Live performances ==
The song was performed publicly for the first time on December 16, 2014, on The Colbert Report, during promotion for Lamar's third studio album, To Pimp a Butterfly. This made it the first Untitled Unmastered song ever publicly revealed. According to Terrace Martin, the lyrics were composed the day before the show because of Lamar's reluctance to perform "I".

== Charts ==
Chart (2016)	Peak position
Sweden Heatseeker (Sverigetopplistan)	19
US Hot R&B/Hip-Hop Songs (Billboard)	49
UK Singles (OCC)	67
