= Untitled 07 – 2014–2016 =

"Untitled 07 | Levitate"

Single by Kendrick Lamar

from the album Untitled Unmastered
- Released: March 23, 2016
- Recorded: 2014
- Genre: Hip-hop; jazz rap; trap
- Length: 2:26 (single version); 8:16 (album version)
- Label: TDE; Aftermath; Interscope
- Songwriters: Kendrick Duckworth; Adam Feeney; Kasseem Dean; Ronald LaTour, Jr.; Daveon Jackson; Brock Korsan
- Producers: Frank Dukes; Cardo; Yung Exclusive; Egypt Dean

Kendrick Lamar singles chronology
"These Walls" (2015)	"Untitled 07 | Levitate" (2016)	"Holy Key" (2016)

"Untitled 07 | 2014–2016" (single version titled "Untitled 07 | Levitate") is a song by American hip-hop recording artist Kendrick Lamar, taken from his 2016 compilation album, Untitled Unmastered On March 23, 2016, "Untitled 07 | Levitate" was released separately on the iTunes Store as the compilation's lead single. It was produced by Frank Dukes, Cardo, and Deveon "Yung Exclusive" Jackson, along with Swizz Beatz and Alicia Keys' son Egypt Dean, who also provides additional vocals along with SZA.

== Production ==
The song was produced by Cardo, Deveon "Yung Exclusive" Jackson, Frank Dukes, Swizz Beatz and Egypt Dean. Swizz Beatz has said that his and Alicia Keys' 5-year-old son Egypt produced "untitled 07". TDE producer Sounwave has confirmed on Twitter that Egypt produced the second half of the track.

== Chart performance ==
On the chart dated March 26, 2016, "Untitled 07 | 2014–2016" entered the Billboard Hot 100 at number 90, powered by first-week digital download sales of 21,806 copies. It is the fifth longest song to chart on the Hot 100.

== Track listing ==
- Digital download
1. "untitled 07 | levitate" (Explicit) – 2:26
- Digital download
1. "untitled 07 | 2014–2016" (Explicit) – 8:16

== Live performance ==
Kendrick Lamar performed the song at the NCAA March Madness Musical Festival in Houston on April 2, 2016. The song has been performed live at every show on the Damn tour.

== Charts ==
Chart (2016)	Peak position
France (SNEP)	197
UK Singles (Official Charts)	93
UK Hip Hop/R&B (Official Charts)	20
US Billboard Hot 100	90
US Hot R&B/Hip-Hop Songs (Billboard)	27
US Hot Rap Songs (Billboard)	16

== Certifications ==
Certifications
Region	Certification	Certified units/sales
New Zealand (RMNZ)	Gold	15,000^{‡}
^{‡} Sales+streaming figures based on certification alone.
