= Anna Wise =

American singer

- Also known as: Anna the Wise
- Born: February 16, 1991 (age 35)
- Genres: Alternative R&B, art pop
- Occupations: Singer; songwriter; producer
- Instrument: Vocals
- Years active: 2009–present
- Formerly of: Sonnymoon; Built to Fade
- Website: Official website

Anna Christine Wise (born February 16, 1991) is an American singer, who has independently released music as a member of bands Sonnymoon and Built to Fade. She became more widely known for her collaborations with rapper Kendrick Lamar and hip hop group CunninLynguists. She won a Grammy Award for her collaboration with Lamar, "These Walls".

Wise began her musical career with the band Sonnymoon, a collaboration with Dane Orr, who she met while studying at Berklee College of Music.

She was a part of the group Built to Fade alongside Dane Ferguson, Zoë Wick and Kno of CunninLynguists. While Wise was touring with Sonnymoon, Kendrick Lamar contacted her after hearing her music on YouTube through another emcee, Tunji. She now has become a regular collaborator with Lamar, appearing on 11 tracks. Since 2016, she has released four solo albums.

Wise is married to musician Jon Bap (Maurice II) and the couple has a daughter.

== Discography ==
=== Studio albums ===
List of studio albums
Title	Album details
The Feminine: Act II	Released: February 17, 2017; Label: N/A; Formats: LP, streaming
Geovariance	Released: June 27, 2018; Label: N/A; Formats: LP, streaming
As If It Were Forever	Released: October 18, 2019; Label: N/A; Formats: LP, streaming
Subtle Body Dawn	Released: February 16, 2023; Label: N/A; Formats: LP, streaming

=== Extended plays ===
List of extended plays
Title	EP details
The Feminine: Act I	Released: April 26, 2016; Label: N/A; Formats: Digital download, streaming

=== Singles ===
List of singles as lead artist, showing year released and album name
Title	Year	Album
"Precious Possession"	2016	The Feminine: Act I
"BitchSlut"	2016	The Feminine: Act I
"Coconuts"	2017	The Feminine: Act II
"Easy" (with Xavier Omär)	2018	Insecure: Music from the HBO Original Series, Season 3

== Awards and nominations ==
Year	Awards	Category	Work	Outcome
2014	Grammy Awards	Album of the Year	Good Kid, M.A.A.D. City	Nominated
2016	Grammy Awards	Album of the Year	To Pimp a Butterfly	Nominated
2016	Grammy Awards	Best Rap/Sung Performance	"These Walls"	Won
