= Kendrick Lamar Live: The Big Steppers Tour =

2022 American concert film

- Prime Video promo
- Directed by: Mike Carson; Dave Free; Mark A. Ritchie
- Based on: The Big Steppers Tour
- Produced by: Mark A. Ritchie; Christian Coffey; Debra Davis; Jamie Rabineau; Cornell Brown; Jared Heinke; Hank Neuberger
- Starring: Kendrick Lamar
- Narrated by: Helen Mirren
- Cinematography: Kenneth Wales
- Edited by: Neal Farmer
- Music by: Kendrick Lamar
- Production companies: PGLang; Springboard Productions; SR Films
- Distributed by: Amazon Studios
- Release date: November 23, 2022
- Running time: 103 minutes
- Country: United States
- Language: English

Kendrick Lamar Live: The Big Steppers Tour (Note: also known as The Big Steppers Tour: Live from Paris and Live from Paris, The Big Steppers Tour.) is a 2022 American concert film documenting The Big Steppers Tour, the 2022–2024 concert tour by rapper Kendrick Lamar. Directed by Mike Carson, Dave Free and Mark A. Ritchie, it was filmed in October 2022 at Accor Arena in Paris.

The film stars Lamar as Mr. Morale, the titular character from his fifth studio album Mr. Morale & the Big Steppers (2022), who is tasked with exiting his comfort zone through therapy. Baby Keem and Tanna Leone, who are the tour's opening acts, make appearances in the film. Helen Mirren serves as the primary narrator of the film, portraying Lamar's therapist who guides him throughout the performance. Additional narration is provided by Whitney Alford and Kodak Black.

Kendrick Lamar Live: The Big Steppers Tour was first broadcast live on October 22, 2022, on Twitch to commemorate the ten-year anniversary of Lamar's second album Good Kid, M.A.A.D City (2012). The director's cut was released on November 23, 2022, through Amazon Prime Video. The film was met with acclaim from critics, who applauded its music direction, visual effects, choreography, cinematography, and Lamar's showmanship. It received a nomination for Best Music Film at the 66th Annual Grammy Awards.

== Plot ==
Militarized dancers greet Mr. Morale, who sits alone on a piano with a puppet ("United in Grief"). His therapist, Helen Mirren, introduces herself as his guide throughout the performance and informs him that he has been living in his comfort zone for over 1,855 days. She suggests that it is time for him to leave ("N95", "Element"). Kodak Black introduces the audience to the "Big Stepper" as Mr. Morale begins to address his internal struggles, which includes suffering from a sex addiction and committing infidelity ("Worldwide Steppers"). He downplays the severity of his actions ("Backseat Freestyle", "Rich Spirit"). Mirren scolds him for letting his ego get the best of him once again, and asks if he needed a reminder of the events that transpired the last time he employed defence mechanisms ("Humble").

After receiving a recommendation from his partner, Whitney Alford, Mr. Morale begins to take therapy seriously and unpacks his childhood trauma ("Father Time"). Mirren does not blame him for being a product of his environment, but advises that it is his sole responsibility to maneuver through his pain ("M.A.A.D City"). As a silhouette of a couple arguing and reconciling is shown, Mr. Morale formally welcomes the audience to the show ("Purple Hearts", "King Kunta"). Before continuing with his journey, he decides to check the temperature of the crowd ("Loyalty" / "Swimming Pools (Drank)"). He then encounters a female dancer ("Bitch, Don't Kill My Vibe"), who later seduces him with her peers ("Die Hard"). Mirren is very disappointed with his relapse and asks him if he needs to remember who he is ("DNA"). As Alford realizes that he is nearing a breakthrough, Mirren counsels him to get past himself in order to move further ("Count Me Out").

Following a period of interacting with the audience ("Money Trees", "Love"), Mr. Morale is enclosed in a small box with four dancers, each wearing hazmat suits. Mirren instructs him to take a COVID-19 test, and assures him that it is for his own good ("Alright"). She then asks the audience if they were entertained, before informing him that he had been contaminated. He is then cleansed with non-lethal smoke and elevated into the air ("Mirror", "Silent Hill"). As Mr. Morale is lowered back to the ground, he encounters Baby Keem and lets himself loose ("Vent" / "Range Brothers", "Family Ties"). Mirren notices that the audience is now following him, and warns him that with great power comes great responsibility ("Crown", "Mr. Morale" with Tanna Leone). Using the knowledge he obtained during therapy, Mr. Morale sheds his savior complex ("Savior"). He thanks the audience for attending the show, flashes a smile, and is escorted from the stage. Mirren congratulates him for escaping the box and wonders if he can stay out for good.

== Production ==
On May 13, 2022, immediately following the release of his fifth studio album Mr. Morale & the Big Steppers, Kendrick Lamar formally announced his fifth concert tour, the Big Steppers Tour. Promoted by Live Nation Entertainment, the tour was sponsored by Cash App and Amazon Music Rotation, the streaming platform's flagship brand for hip hop and R&B. On October 18, while embarking on the tour's European leg, Lamar and Amazon Studios announced that his second performance at Accor Arena in Paris would be livestreamed through Amazon Music and exclusively released via Amazon Prime Video.

The concert film, directed by Mike Carson, Dave Free and Mark A. Ritchie, required 18 months of "meticulous" planning and preparation. The film was executive produced by Lamar and Free for PGLang and Hank Neuberger for Springboard Productions. Amazon Music worked closely with PGLang to "figure out the right moment for this particular show." The two parties "went back and forth" on which performance across the tour would be ideal to record; ultimately choosing Lamar's second Paris performance as it marked both the ten-year anniversary of the release of his second studio album Good Kid, M.A.A.D City (2012) and co-opening act Baby Keem's birthday. Lamar's hometown performances in Los Angeles and shows across Scandinavia were analyzed to help shape plans for the film.

Along with the tour's usual personnel, the film needed additional camera operators and other technicians to handle its sound boards, lighting panels and a "galaxy of other NASA-level" technical equipment. Two trucks, one for video production and one for audio, were parked outside the arena for the recording; each truck contained "state-of-the-art" production studios. The film's "detailed" cinematography was choreographed before the recording and was captured across 19 cameras. For the final performance of the film, "Savior", the film uses deepfake technology to morph Lamar into the three figures he mentions in the song's opening lines: rappers J. Cole and Future and basketball player LeBron James. The deepfakes were provided by Matt Stone and Trey Parker's Deep Voodoo studio, who previously worked with Lamar and Free for the music video to "The Heart Part 5".

== Release ==
The concert film was broadcast live through Amazon Music and their Twitch channel on October 22, 2022; the livestream featured Keem and Tanna Leone's respective opening performances. It was also shown at pop-up viewing experiences in various locations, including a second location in Paris, Accra, Rio de Janeiro and the Brooklyn Museum. Merchandise for the recording, designed in partnership with clothing brand Union Los Angeles, was released on October 21. A director's cut of Lamar's performance was released exclusively to Prime Video on November 23. The film was screened at Roxy Cinema in New York City on December 12, 2023.

== Critical reception ==
The concert film received critical acclaim for Lamar's performance, the stage production and the audience. Jem Aswad of Variety complimented the Parisian audience and how they went "absolutely batshit — they reacted to opener Tanna Leone like he was Baby Keem, and reacted to higher-billed opener Baby Keem like he was [Lamar], and reacted to [Lamar] like they’d just won $1,000." He then praised Lamar's "intricately planned and subtle" performance, writing that "unlike virtually every other rapper (with some top-shelf exceptions like Drake, Jay and Em), Lamar is a master of low-key intensity. He doesn’t jump, he rarely raises his voice, and he doesn’t dance conventionally. But a closer look reveals that the deeply disciplined control and complexity of his lyrics is fully equaled in his performance, from his moves to the lighting and effects."

In a five-star review, Fred Garratt-Stanley of NME praised the show's music direction, noting that "blending the moody introspection of [Mr. Morale & the Big Steppers] with the clean punchiness of [Good Kid, M.A.A.D City] is no easy task, but it is accomplished expertly." He also praised the performance's "inventive choreography and visual effects" that "take the show to new heights, without detracting from the musical focus, as sound and vision intertwine fluidly to create a genuinely staggering spectacle." Although he was disappointed that the Lamar didn't perform many songs from his third studio album To Pimp a Butterfly (2015), Garratt-Stanley lauded his "intricately choreographed and rehearsed" actions that made him believe at one point that he was watching a pre-recorded feed, his "intense dedication to his craft," and the rare glimpse of his "playful personality" near the end of the performance. "There’s a human touch here that can sometimes be lost in the midst of creative genius," he writes. ‘Mr. Morale’ insisted on showing the rapper’s flaws and deconstructing the god complex that surrounds him, although ironically, the album’s tour presents a creative vision that would boggle the minds of most mere mortals. It’s a stunning, moving display from a true great of modern rap."

=== Accolades ===
Awards and nominations for Kendrick Lamar Live: The Big Steppers Tour
Award	Date of ceremony	Category	Recipient(s)	Result	Ref.
Billboard Fan-Voted Favorites	December 15, 2023	Favorite Music Documentary	Kendrick Lamar	Nominated	
Grammy Awards	February 4, 2024	Best Music Film	Kendrick Lamar (performer); Dave Free, Mike Carson, and Mark A. Ritchie (video directors); Cornell Brown, Debra Davis, Hank Neuberger, Jared Heinke, and Jamie Rabineau (video producers)	Nominated	
