= Uber Arena =

Multipurpose indoor arena in Berlin, Germany

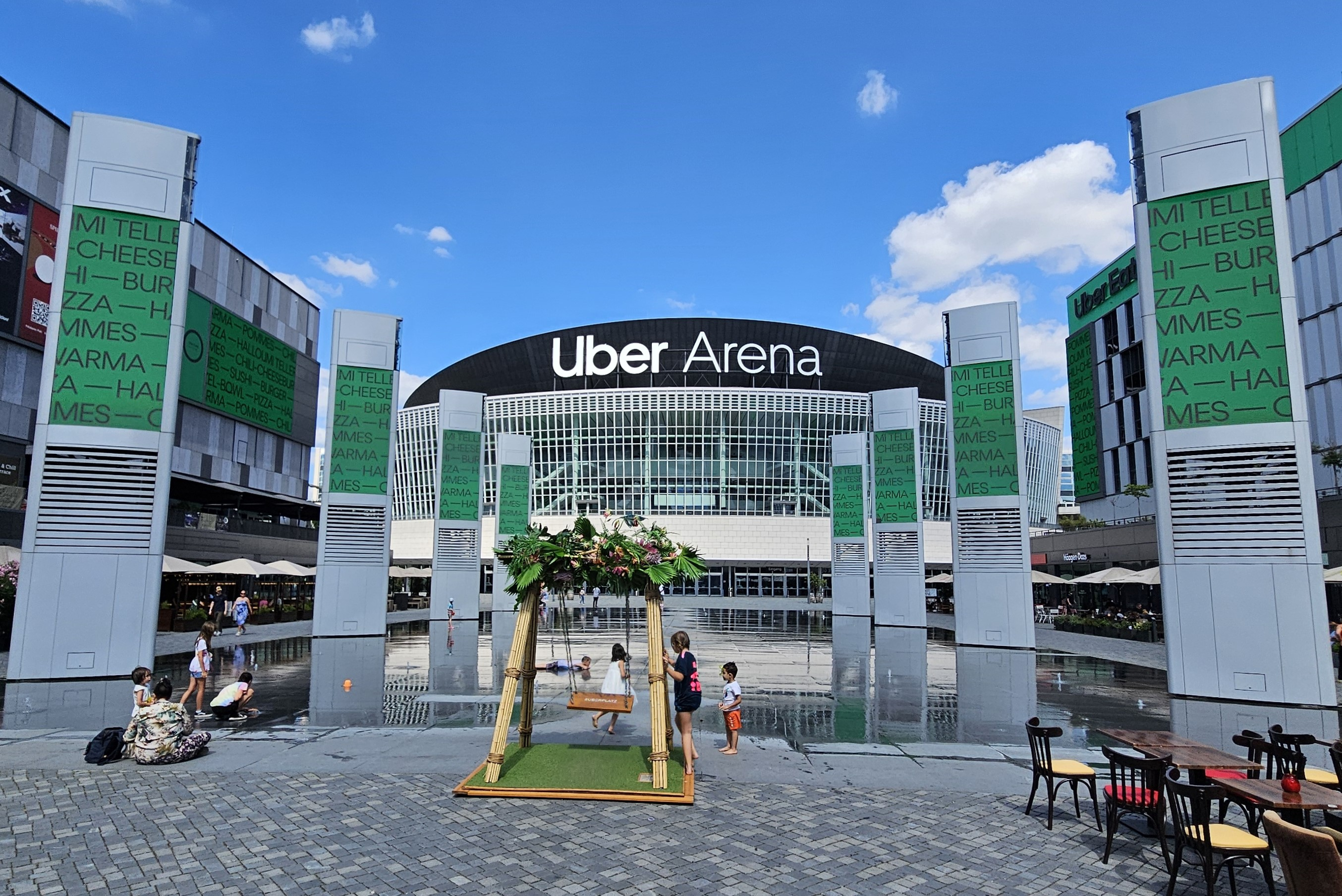
- Interactive map of Uber Arena
- Former names: O_{2} World (2008–2015); Mercedes-Benz Arena (2015–2024)
- Address: Uber-Platz 1
- Location: Friedrichshain, Berlin, Germany
- Coordinates: 52°30′20″N 13°26′36″E
- Operator: AEG
- Capacity: Concerts/MMA: 17,000; Basketball: 14,500; Ice hockey: 14,200
- Surface: Multi-surface

Construction
- Groundbreaking: 2006
- Opened: September 2008
- Cost: €165 million
- Architects: HOK Sport (now Populous); JSK Architects

Tenants
- Alba Berlin (BBL) (2008–present); Eisbären Berlin (DEL) (2008–present)

Website
- Official website

Uber Arena (previously branded as O_{2} World and Mercedes-Benz Arena) is a multipurpose indoor arena in the Friedrichshain neighborhood of Berlin, Germany, which opened in 2008. The venue became known as Uber Arena following a long-term deal with venue operators AEG Europe in 2024.

With a maximum capacity of 17,000 people (for concerts or MMA), it is home to the Eisbären Berlin ice hockey club and the Alba Berlin basketball team, and is used for other athletic and civic events, as well as concerts.

The arena hosted three EuroLeague Final Four's (2009, 2016, and most recently 2024), which is the European professional basketball club competition. The arena was one of the most prominent elements of the Mediaspree urban redevelopment project, quickly gaining emblematic status in the debates surrounding the project's impact.

== Naming rights ==
In 2015, German car manufacturer Mercedes-Benz reached a deal with the arena management to rename the venue Mercedes-Benz Arena Berlin for twenty years. Between 2008 and 2015, the arena was known as O_{2} World Berlin (German: [ɔʊˈtuː ˌvœːɐ̯lt]) due to sponsorship contract with Telefónica Germany, a telecommunications company.

In March 2024, the arena became known as the Uber Arena, following a long-term deal with venue operators AEG Europe. The adjacent venue rebranded from the Verti Music Hall to the Uber Eats Music Hall, and the entertainment quarter rebranded from Mercedes Platz to Uber Platz.

== Notable events ==
- The first band to play at the Mercedes-Benz Arena was Metallica, on 12 September 2008.
- Tina Turner performed two sold-out concerts on 26–27 January 2009 during her Tina!: 50th Anniversary Tour.
- The arena was the venue for the 2009 MTV Europe Music Awards.
- Sting performed during his Symphonicities Tour on 21 September 2010, along with the Royal Philharmonic Orchestra. This show was recorded for his concert album, Live in Berlin.
- On 21 February 2009, Scorpions received Germany's ECHO Honorary Award for lifetime achievement at Berlin's O2 World.
- The venue played host to one NHL Premiere game for the 2011–12 NHL season on 8 October 2011, which was the first regular season NHL game in Germany. The Buffalo Sabres defeated the Los Angeles Kings, 4–2.
- The arena hosted the second stage of the 2011 Euro Beach Soccer League between 8–10 July.
- American singer Britney Spears performed a sold-out concert on 26 July 2009 during her tour The Circus Starring: Britney Spears. She returned for another sold-out show on 6 August 2018 as part of her Britney Spears: Piece of Me Tour.
- Muse performed a sold-out concert on 29 October 2009 during The Resistance Tour.
- Australian singer Kylie Minogue performed her Aphrodite: Les Folies Tour show on 1 March 2011. She will return on 4 July 2025 for her Tension Tour.
- Bob Dylan and Mark Knopfler played the O2 during their dual European tour on 29 October 2011.
- Coldplay performed a sold-out show at the arena on 21 December 2011 as part of their Mylo Xyloto Tour.
- On 27 March 2012, Il Divo performed a concert as part of their 2012 Wicked Game album tour.
- American singer Madonna performed during her MDNA Tour on two sold-out nights in June 2012, and returned for two shows in November 2015 on her Rebel Heart Tour.
- Pearl Jam performed at the arena on 4–5 July 2012 during their 2012 tour.
- Italian singer Laura Pausini performed here as part of her Inedito World Tour.
- The Beach Boys played during their 50th Anniversary Tour in August 2012.
- Lady Gaga performed her Born This Way Ball tour in September 2012, and on 9 October 2014 for her ArtRave: The Artpop Ball tour.
- American singer Jennifer Lopez performed during her Dance Again World Tour in October 2012.
- Beach soccer returned to the arena in August 2012 to again host the second stage of the 2012 Euro Beach Soccer League.
- One Direction performed on 11 May 2013 on their Take Me Home Tour.
- American icon Beyoncé performed to two sold-out crowds on 23 and 24 May 2013 with her Mrs. Carter Show.
- Iron Maiden performed on 18 June 2013.
- Rihanna performed on 2 July 2013, on her Diamonds World Tour.
- On 7 February 2014, Taylor Swift performed a show on her Red Tour.
- On 22 May 2014, French-Armenian singer Charles Aznavour performed a show as part of his The Legend Returns Tour.
- On 19 November 2014 rock band Linkin Park performed a show as a part of their The Hunting Party Tour. They returned to the venue on 12 June 2017 as part of their One More Light World Tour.
- Depeche Mode performed at the stadium six times: the first was on 9 January 2010 during their Tour of the Universe. The second and the third were on 25/27 November 2013 during their Delta Machine Tour, in front of a total sold-out crowd of 28,332 people. The 2013 shows were filmed and recorded for the group's live album and concert film Live in Berlin. The fourth, fifth, and sixth shows were during their Memento Mori tour on 13/15/20 February 2024.
- U2 performed at the arena on 24, 25, 28 and 29 September 2015 as part of their Innocence + Experience Tour. They also played at the arena on 31 August and 1 September 2018 as part of their Experience + Innocence Tour.
- Irish-American dancer and musician Michael Flatley reprised his role as 'Lord of the Dance' on 6 December 2010 during the Return of Michael Flatley As Lord of the Dance tour. A few scenes from the 3D concert film Lord of the Dance 3D were filmed during this performance, as well as at the O2 London and O2 Dublin. The film was released on DVD and Blu-ray under the title Michael Flatley Returns As Lord of the Dance in 2011. A 3D version was released only in Blu-ray in late 2011.
- In October 2013, the artist Jakob Kupfer transformed the LED facade of the O2 World Berlin into a giant art installation.
- On 31 May 2014 UFC Fight Night: Muñoz vs. Mousasi was the first event that the UFC had hosted in the venue.
- The venue hosted group matches of the FIBA EuroBasket 2015.
- On 13 October 2015, the Violetta cast performed a sold-out concert as part of the Violetta Live International Tour.
- On 31 October 2015 the arena hosted the 2015 League of Legends World Championship final.
- On 20 June 2015 held UFC Fight Night: Jędrzejczyk vs. Penne.
- Adele performed on 7&8 May 2016 as part of her Adele Live 2016 tour.
- Celine Dion performed on 23&24 July 2017 as part of her European summer tour, Celine Dion Live 2017.
- On 30 September 2017, G-Dragon performed during his Act III: M.O.T.T.E World Tour.
- On 22 February 2018, it hosted the 4th week of the 2018 Premier League Darts from the Professional Darts Corporation, the first time the event took place in Germany.
- On 22 March 2018, the Soy Luna cast performed at the venue as part of the Soy Luna Live European Tour.
- On 16 October 2018, BTS performed during their second world tour, BTS World Tour: Love Yourself. It was the South Korean group's first time in Europe.
- On 28 February 2019, Nicki Minaj performed as a part of The Nicki Wrld Tour.
- On 14 May 2019, Hugh Jackman performed his The Man. The Music. The Show. tour.
- On 17 May 2019, WWE hosted a house show.
- On 11 July 2019, Christina Aguilera performed during her The X Tour.
- On 13 July 2019, Monsta X performed during their We Are Here World Tour.
- On 5–8 September 2019, the Champions stage of the StarLadder & i-League Berlin Major 2019 was hosted by StarLadder and Valve. This was an official Major tournament where teams from all over the world competed for $1,000,000 prize fund, playing the video game Counter-Strike: Global Offensive.
- On 26 September 2019, singer-actress Cher kicked-off the European leg of her Here We Go Again Tour, her first tour of Europe since her Living Proof: The Farewell Tour (2004).
- On 13 October 2019, GOT7 performed during their 2019 World Tour KEEP SPINNING.
- On 7 and 8 March 2022 Genesis kicked-off the European leg of The Last Domino? Tour.
- On 10 May 2022, Dua Lipa performed a sold-out show as part of her Future Nostalgia Tour.
- On 20 July 2022, Harry Styles performed as a part of his Love on Tour.
- It hosted the final phase matches at the FIBA EuroBasket 2022.
- On 13 June 2022, the arena hosted the 2022 Premier League Darts final.
- On 11 October 2022, Kendrick Lamar performed at the arena (with Baby Keem and Tanna Leone opening) during his The Big Steppers Tour.
- On 19–20 December 2022, Blackpink performed at the arena during their Born Pink World Tour.
- On 14 February 2023, ATEEZ performed at the arena during their THE FELLOWSHIP: BREAK THE WALL World Tour.
- On 20–21 February 2023, Robbie Williams performed at the arena as part of the European leg of his XXV Tour.
- On 3 April 2023, NCT Dream performed for The Dream Show 2: In A Dream.
- On 13 and 14 September 2023, TWICE performed at the arena during their Ready to Be World Tour.
- On 14 October 2023, 50 Cent performed at the arena (with Busta Rhymes as opening act) as part of The Final Lap Tour.
- On 20 October 2023, Louis Tomlinson performed at the arena for his Faith In The Future World Tour.
- On 10 and 11 February 2024, the arena hosted the Hot Wheels Monster Trucks Live Glow Party.
- On 13 March 2024, The 1975 performed at the arena for their Still… At Their Very Best World Tour
- On 4 and 5 May 2024, Monster Jam made its debut at the arena.
- On 6 May 2024, Colombian reggaetón artist J Balvin performed during his Que Buena Volver a Verte Tour.
- On 1 June 2024, Olivia Rodrigo performed at the arena during her Guts World Tour.
- On 7 June 2024, Nicki Minaj performed at the arena during her Pink Friday 2 World Tour.
- On 10 June 2024, IVE performed at the arena during their world tour, SHOW WHAT I HAVE.
- On 23 June 2024, IU performed at the arena during her HEREH World Tour.
- On 2 July 2024, Colombian singer Karol G performed at the arena during her Mañana Será Bonito World Tour.
- On 6 July 2024, The Pet Shop Boys performed Dreamworld: The Greatest Hits Live.
- On 30 July and 31 July 2024, Justin Timberlake performed for The Forget Tomorrow World Tour.
- Uber Arena hosted the pay-per-view and livestreaming event WWE Bash in Berlin on 31 August 2024, as well as an episode of WWE SmackDown, on 30 August 2024.
- Uber Arena hosted the Laver Cup, a men's tennis tournament, from 20 to 22 September 2024.
- On 6 November 2024, NCT DREAM performed for The Dream Show 3: Dream( )scape.
- On 18–19 February 2025, ATEEZ performed at the arena for Towards The Light: Will To Power world tour.
- On 19 March 2025, Sabrina Carpenter performed as part of her Short n' Sweet Tour.
- On 7 May 2025, Ghost performed as part of their Skeletour World Tour 2025.
- On 12 May 2025, Tyler, the Creator performed at the arena as part of his Chromakopia: The World Tour.
- On 4 June 2025, Tate McRae performed at the arena as part of her Miss Possessive Tour.
- On 21 October 2025, Katy Perry performed at the arena during her Lifetimes Tour World Tour.
- On 4 and 5 November 2025, Lady Gaga performed as part of her Mayhem Ball.
- On 15 January 2026, Uber Arena hosted the first regular season NBA game in Germany between the Memphis Grizzlies and Orlando Magic.
- Uber Arena will host the final phase matches at the 2026 FIBA Women's Basketball World Cup.
- On 9 January 2026, Uber Arena hosted the second episode of WWE SmackDown of 2026, where Drew McIntyre wins WWE Championship for the third time.
- On 23 May 2026, TWICE performed at the arena during their This Is For World Tour.

== Attendance ==
This is a list of home attendance figures of Alba Berlin at O2 World.

German League					European competitions				
Season	Total	High	Low	Average	Season	Total	High	Low	Average
2008–09	232,490	14,800	6,103	10,108	2008–09 EL	90,111	14,800	9,147	11,264
2009–10	193,940	14,500	7,543	10,207	2009–10 EC	72,812	14,500	9,283	10,402
2010–11	262,367	14,500	7,431	10,932	2010–11 EC	51,757	9,222	7,114	8,626
2011–12	207,475	14,500	8,845	10,920	2011–12 EC	45,929	8,856	6,184	7,655
2012–13	182,645	13,786	6,878	10,147	2012–13 EL	108,122	11,988	7,816	9,010
2013–14	245,163	14,500	8,105	10,659	2013–14 EC	72,984	8,110	6,204	7,298
2014–15	224,748	13,688	7,277	10,216	2014–15 EL	123,501	14,133	8,226	10,292
2015–16	178,911	14,052	7,218	9,940	2015–16 EC	67,068	8,855	6,251	7,452
2016–17	166,337	13,022	6,376	9,785	2016–17 EC	47,435	8,666	5,429	6,776
2017–18	231,153	13,566	7,543	9,631	2017–18 EC	62,050	8,878	6,322	7,756
2018–19					2018–19 EC	96,555	12,945	6,322	8,046

== Gallery ==
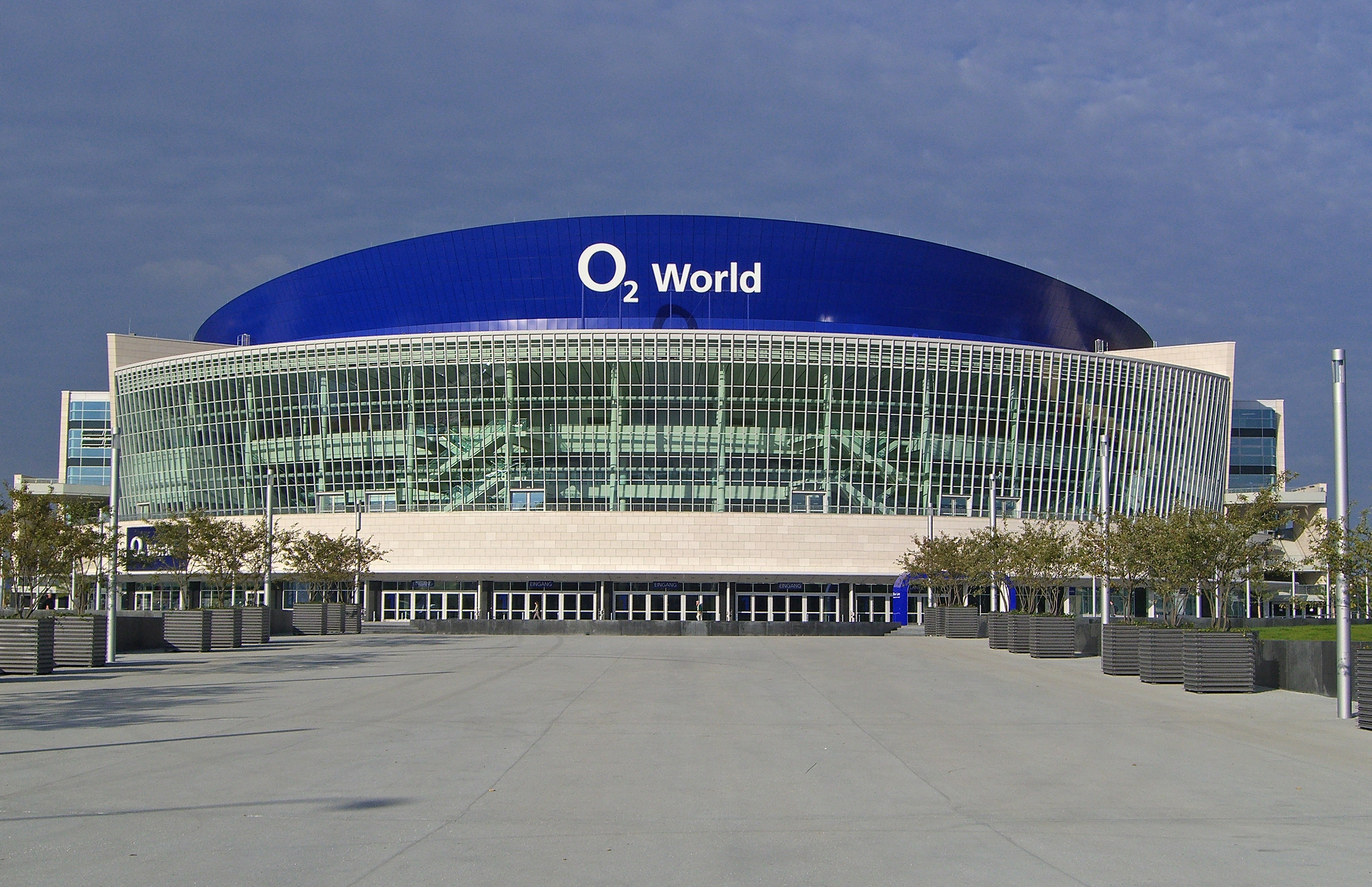
O2 World Berlin

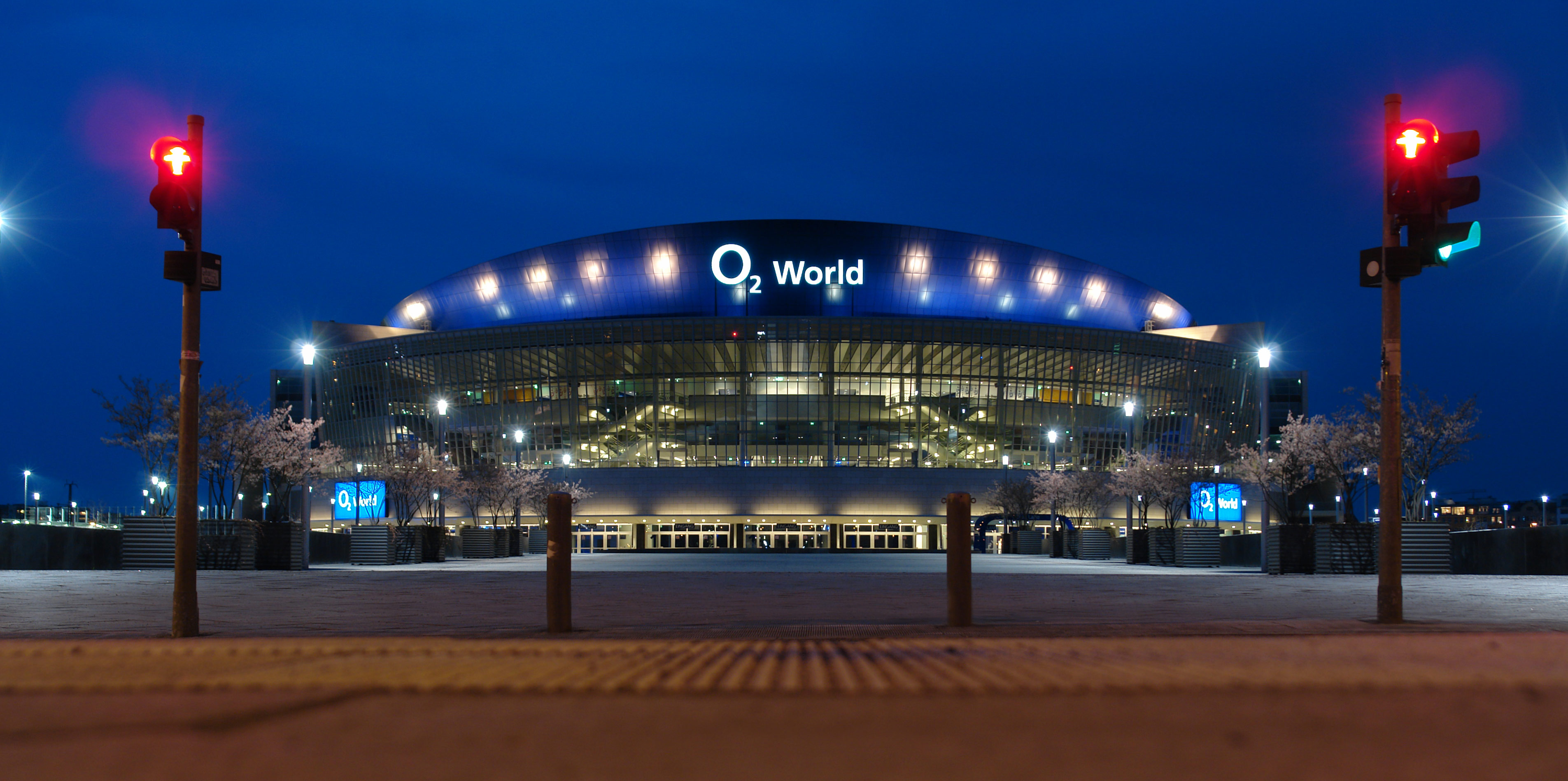
O2 World night

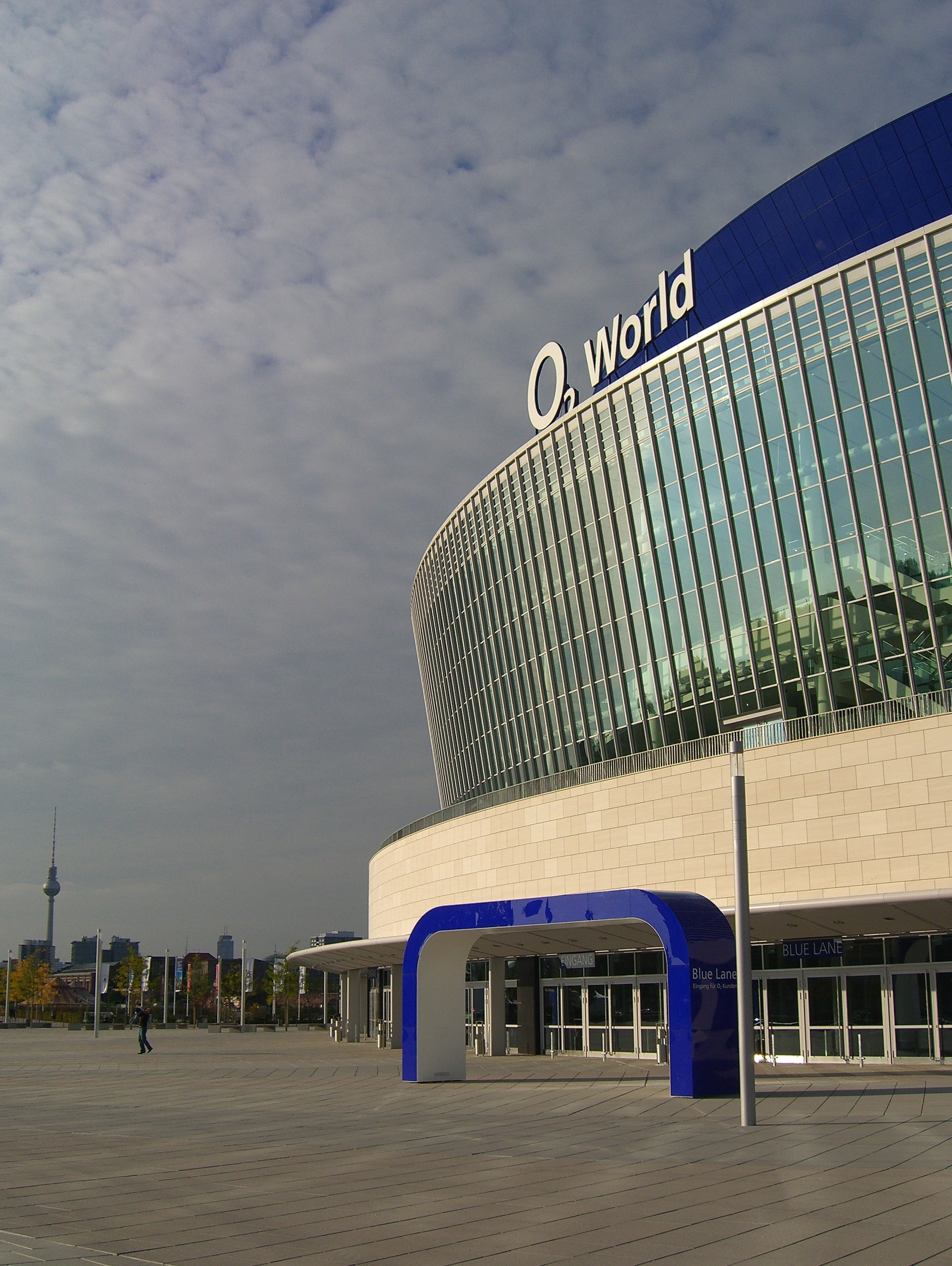
O2 World Berlin main entrance

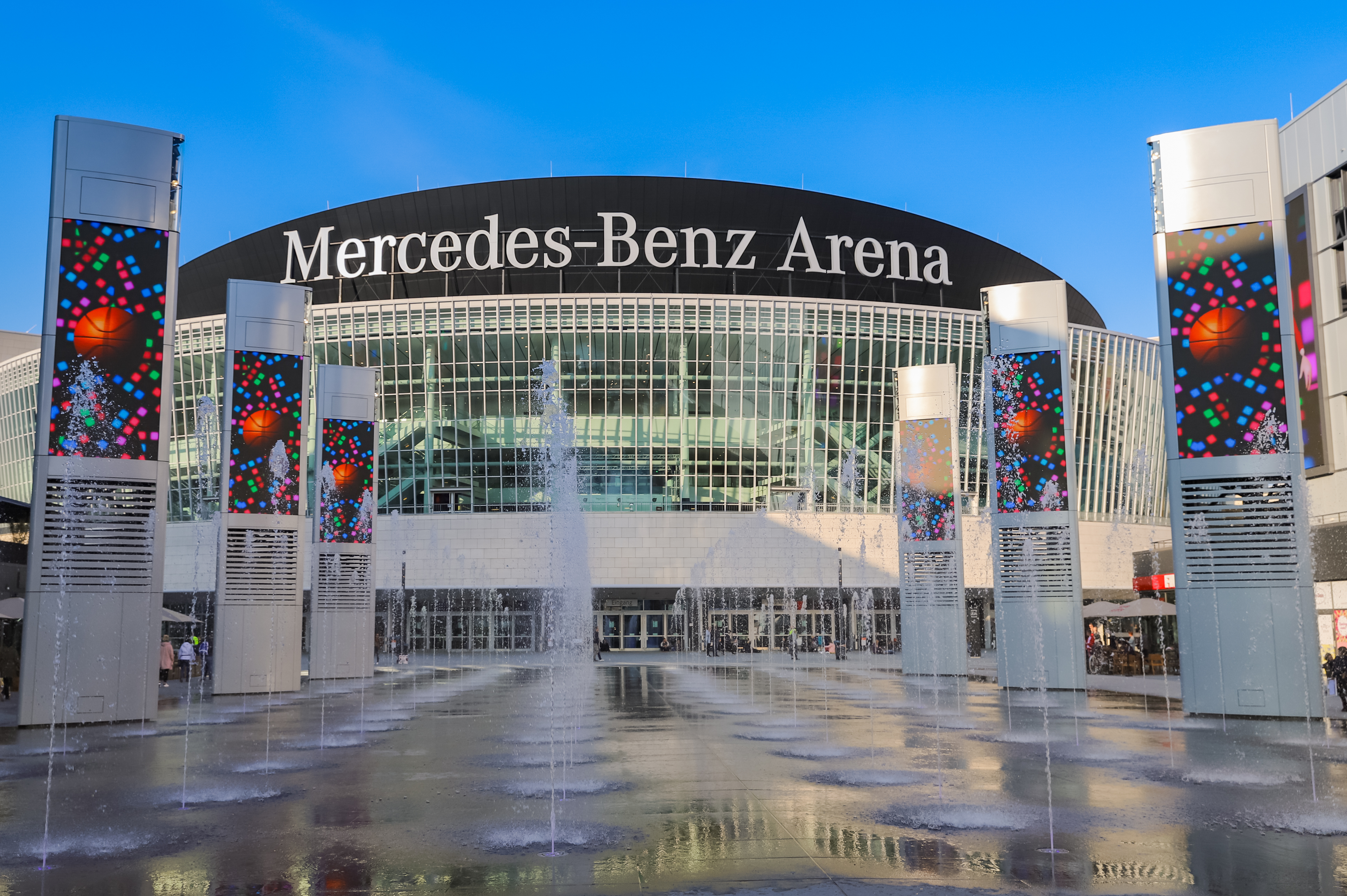
Mercedes-Benz Arena Berlin

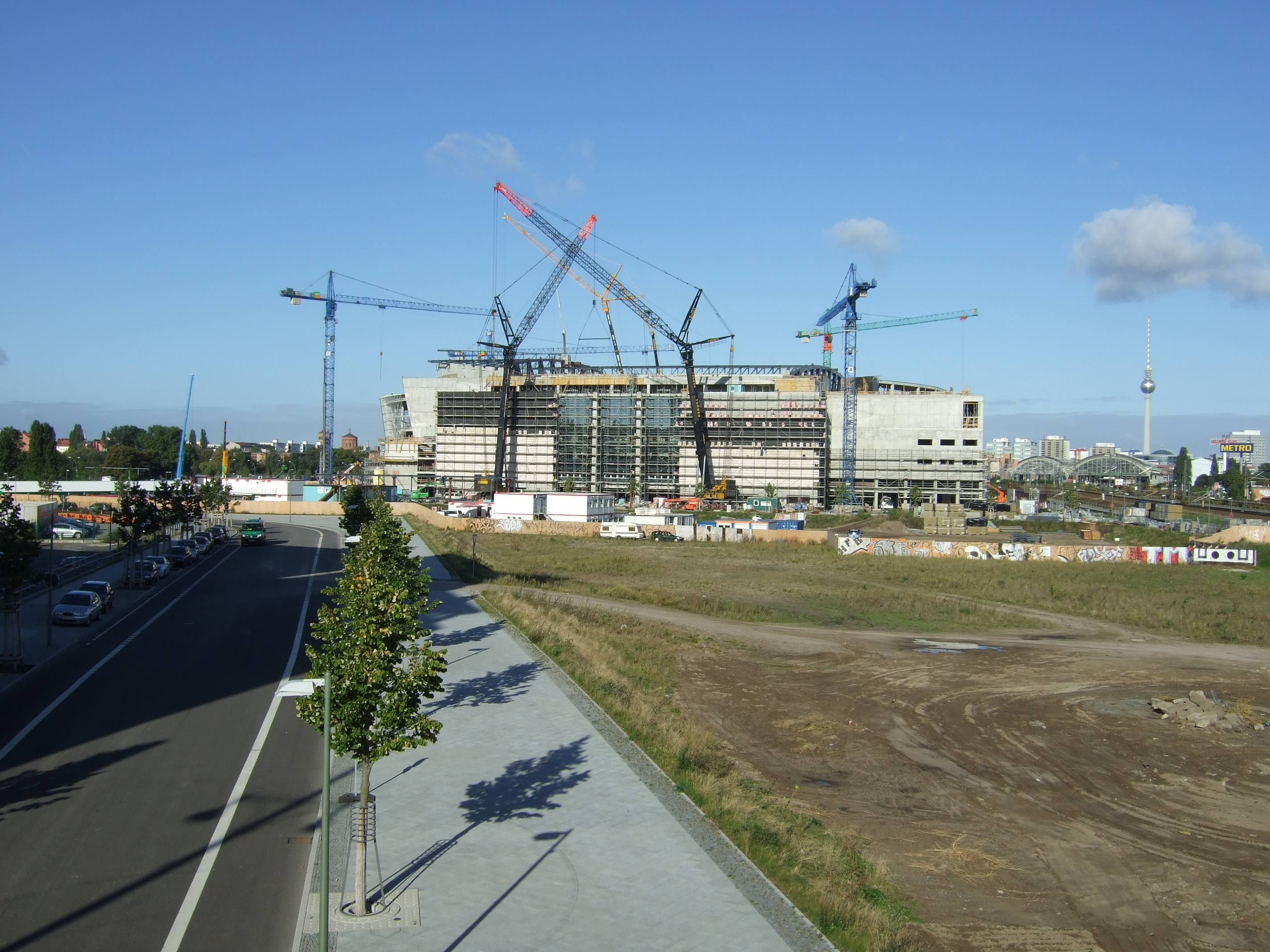
O2 World under construction

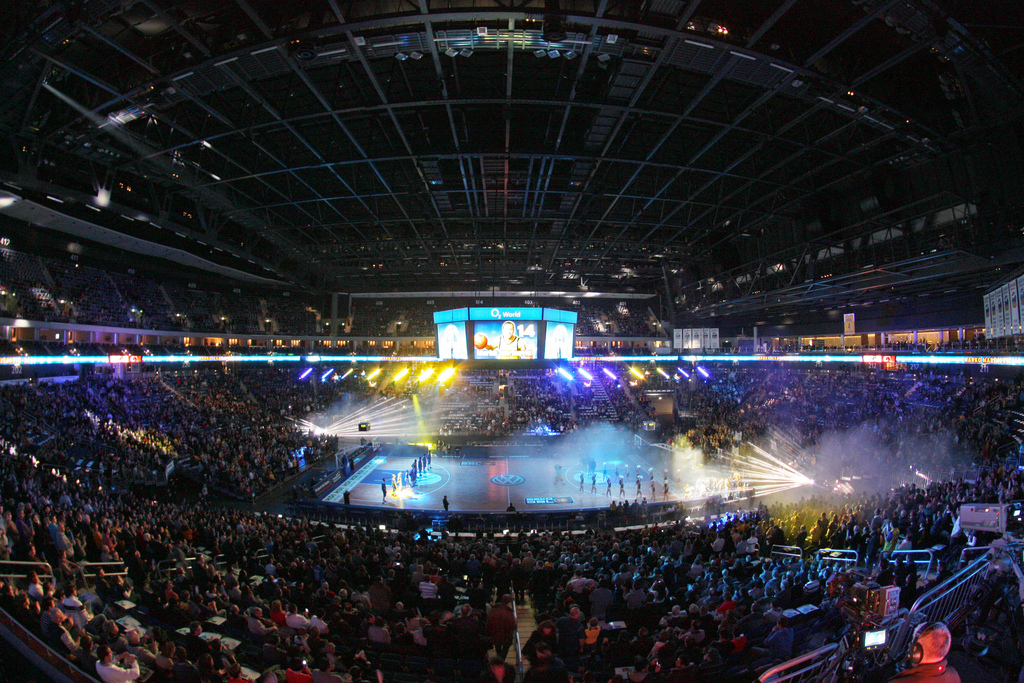
Alba Berlin vs BBC Bayreuth, 19 February 2011

== See also ==
- List of indoor arenas in Germany
- List of European ice hockey arenas

Preceded by Palacio de Deportes de la CAM; Palacio de Deportes de la CAM	Euroleague; Final Four; Venue; 2009; 2016	Succeeded by Palais de Paris-Bercy; Sinan Erdem Dome
Preceded by Seoul World Cup Stadium; Seoul	League of Legends World Championship; Final Venue; 2015	Succeeded by Staples Center; Los Angeles
Preceded by Sinan Erdem Dome; Istanbul	FIBA EuroBasket; Final Venue; 2022	Succeeded by Arena Riga; Riga
