= The Hillbillies =

2023 song by Baby Keem and Kendrick Lamar

Single by Baby Keem and Kendrick Lamar
- Released: May 30, 2023
- Genre: Drill; Jersey club
- Length: 3:24
- Label: PGLang; Columbia
- Songwriters: Hykeem Carter; Kendrick Duckworth; Giane Chenheu; Justin Vernon; Kacy Hill; James Stack; Brandon Burton; Robert Moose; Angus Fairbairn
- Producer: Evilgiane

Baby Keem singles chronology
"Issues" (2021)	"The Hillbillies" (2023)	"Leavemealone" (2023)

Kendrick Lamar singles chronology
"America Has a Problem" (2023)	"The Hillbillies" (2023)	"Like That" (2024)

Music video
- "The Hillbillies" on YouTube

"The Hillbillies" is a song by American rappers Baby Keem and Kendrick Lamar. It was a surprise song, initially released on May 30, 2023, as a YouTube exclusive. The song was later serviced to streaming platforms on June 5, 2023, via PGLang and Columbia Records. A drill track, Keem and Lamar wrote "The Hillbillies" with its producer Evilgiane. It includes a sample of "PDLIF" by Bon Iver, and an interpolation of "Sticky" by Drake.

The song showcases a more relaxed approach from Keem and Lamar, with a conversational flow lyrically centered on various topics such as women, fashion, and fame. An accompanying music video, directed and edited by Neal Farmer, was released on the same day as the song's release. The video was filmed on a VHS camcorder and features outtakes of Keem and Kendrick from their time together on the latter's Big Steppers Tour, while also including a cameo from Tyler, the Creator.

Music critics praised "The Hillbillies" for its Jersey club-inspired production and fun chemistry. In November 2023, Keem and Lamar debuted the song at the Camp Flog Gnaw Carnival, with Tyler, the Creator making a surprise appearance in the middle of the performance. "The Hillbillies" was later nominated for Best Rap Performance at the 66th Annual Grammy Awards. Commercially, the song appeared on the US Billboard Hot 100, US Hot R&B/Hip-Hop Songs, and US Rhythmic Airplay charts, with the latter being the most successful with its peak of number 27. Internationally, "The Hillbillies" appeared on the New Zealand Hot Singles chart and Canadian Hot 100.

== Background and release ==
American rappers and cousins Baby Keem and Kendrick Lamar collaborated on "Family Ties" and "Range Brothers" from the former's album The Melodic Blue (2021). Keem had also made contributions to Lamar's critically acclaimed album Mr. Morale & the Big Steppers (2022). From July to December 2022, Keem and Lamar embarked on the latter's Big Steppers Tour. During the final stop of the tour's European leg in Manchester, the cousins paused the show to film material for a potential music video they can "take back to L.A."

Evilgiane's method of sampling caught the attention of Keem, leading them to both connect on Instagram in late 2022 with the latter asking the former to "send him some beats." "The Hillbillies" was surprise-released on May 30, 2023, exclusively on PGLang's YouTube channel. It was also released to Tidal on June 2 with distribution from Columbia, followed by other streaming services three days later. It is the second song Lamar appeared on in 2023, following a remix of Beyoncé's "America Has a Problem". On June 20, "The Hillbillies" was released to urban radio formats in the US.

== Music and lyrics ==
"The Hillbillies"
With production inspired by UK drill and Jersey club, Keem and Lamar exchange "playful" and conversation flows about multiple topics throughout "The Hillbillies".

Produced by Evilgiane of Surf Gang, "The Hillbillies" features hi-hats inspired by UK drill and bass-led Jersey club production. In contrast to Keen and Lamar's "conceptual boxes", "The Hillbillies" emphasizes a relaxed and loose tone, as Keem and Lamar lyrically exchange "playful" and conversational flows involving "their favorite subjects": women, fashion and fame. Lyrical themes range from ordering McDonald's upon the conclusion of a flight and dressing well, to Lamar's 5'7" stature.

With Pitchfork writer Dylan Green describing the song as a sequel to Keem's "Range Brothers" (2021), it features "tag-team rapping and ridiculous adlibs." For example, Kendrick responds to Keem's "That's a deep deep deep deep deep ocean" by shouting "That twat!". Throughout the song, they compare themselves to professional footballers Lionel Messi and Neymar, while Lamar references designers Martine Rose and Grace Wales Bonner. "The Hillbillies" interpolates the flow of "Sticky" (2022) by Canadian rapper Drake on its refrain, and samples the charity single "PDLIF" (2020) by American indie folk band Bon Iver, which Evilgiane used because of how "pretty" it sounds. "PDLIF" additionally samples English musician Alabaster DePlume's single "Visit Croatia" (2020).

== Music video ==
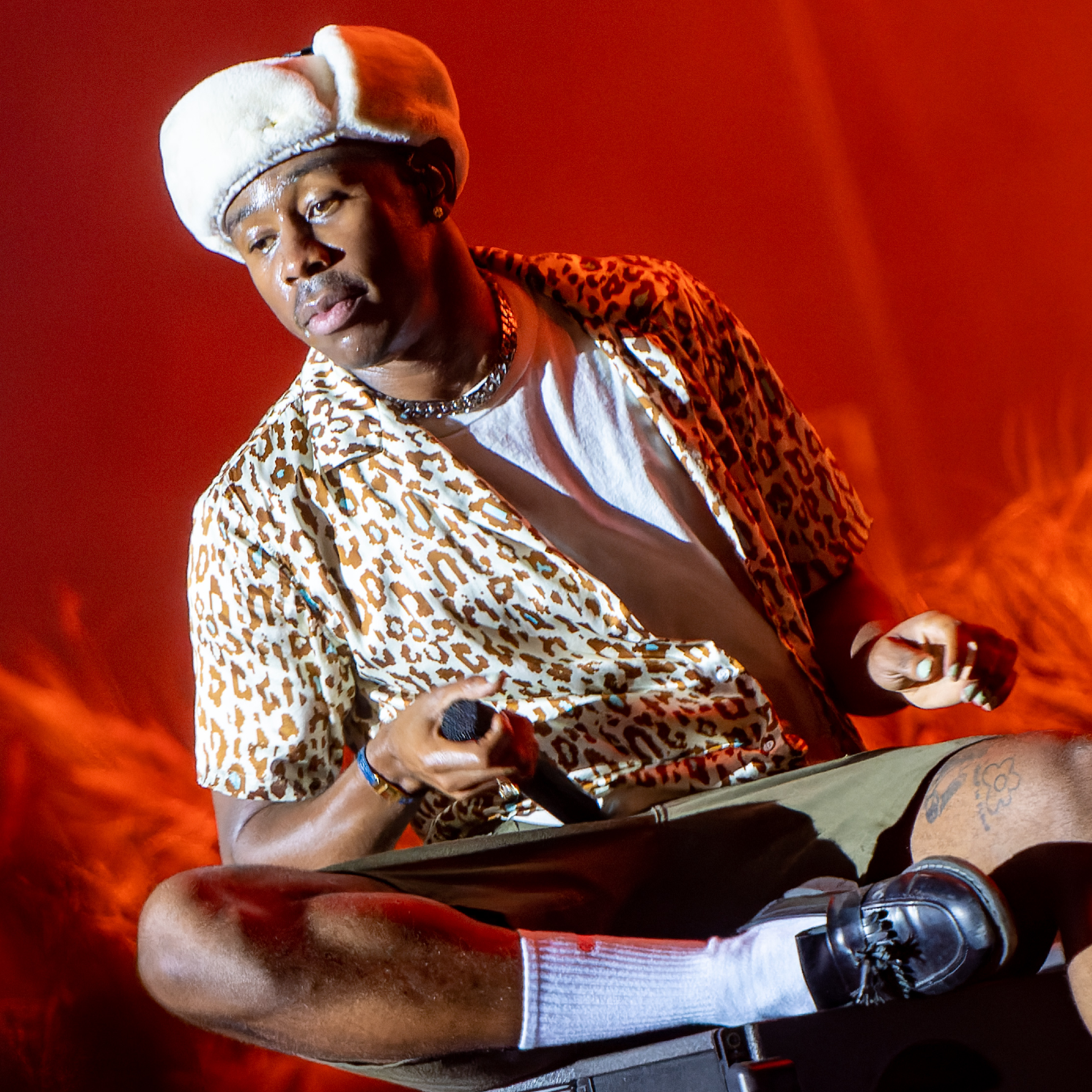
Tyler, the Creator makes a guest appearance in the music video

The official music video for "The Hillbillies", directed and edited by Neal Farmer, was released alongside the song on May 30, 2023. It was filmed entirely on a VHS camcorder during the end of the Big Steppers Tour's European leg, and follows Keem and Lamar as they travel around Europe and the US. Vulture writer Zoe Guy described the VHS-recorded music video as taken from "'90s aesthetics and homemade music videos". Landmarks featured in the music video include the London Eye, Millennium Bridge, Stephen's Green Shopping Centre in Dublin, and Dodger Stadium in Los Angeles.

Beginning with a title card reminiscent of menu graphics for a video game, Keem and Lamar are seen "being in a silly, goofy mood" throughout the "casual" lo-fi video, as they explore and dance around various cities and in their private jet. They are also seen playing video games on a PlayStation and dragging "semi-confused" front desk staff members into their shenanigans. Keem and Lamar also show off their fashion and do "little dances for the camera". American rapper Tyler, the Creator makes a cameo appearance in the video, where he kisses the camera and dances in front of the stadium with both Lamar and Keen. The three later appear with a "classic sky-blue Beemer and a beige Bentley." At the end of the video, Tyler, the Creator flashes a Camp Flog Gnaw pin, teasing its 2023 festival.

== Reception ==
Stereogum's Chris Deville was excited about "The Hillbillies" sampling Bon Iver and Alabaster DePlume, and called the song "awesome" after a few listens. He described the track as being more like a "hype-building pre-album loosie", rather than the "proper single" feel of Keem and Lamar's previous collaborations, and dubbed the song a "blog-era classic if we were still in the blog era." "The Hillbillies" was named as Pitchfork's "Best New Track", with Dylan Green noting that the song is the "most relaxed and loose" Keem and Lamar have seemed in a while. He applauded the track for keeping up with their typical "silly" antics and found their "ridiculous" ad-libs hilarious.

Jayson Buford of Rolling Stone appreciated the track for offering a glimpse of the vision for "whatever" Lamar and Dave Free's PGLang entails. He praised Lamar for being "irreverent and fun in a way he usually isn't," noting that some of his verses reminded him of his earlier works with Dom Kennedy and Fredo Santana. By the end of 2023, Rolling Stone ranked "The Hillbillies" at number 45 on their "100 Best Songs of 2023" list. The song received a nomination for Best Rap Performance at the 66th Annual Grammy Awards in 2024.

Commercially, "The Hillbillies" debuted and peaked at number 93 on the US Billboard Hot 100 and number 34 on the US Hot R&B/Hip-Hop Songs chart on the week of June 24, 2023. The song was more successful on the US Rhythmic Airplay chart, lasting on the chart for eight weeks and peaking at number 27 on the week of August 12. Internationally, it peaked at number fourteen on the New Zealand Hot Singles chart and number 80 on the Canadian Hot 100.

== Live performance ==
On August 18, 2023, the Camp Flog Gnaw setlist for that year was announced, which featured the Hillbillies (Keem and Lamar) as a headline artist alongside SZA and Tyler, the Creator. The 23-song set performance took place on November 11 at Dodger Stadium in Los Angeles, with "The Hillbillies" serving as the final track. In the middle of the performance, Tyler, the Creator showed up on the stage as a nod to his cameo from the music video.

== Personnel ==
Credits were adapted from Tidal.

Musicians

- Hykeem Carter – vocals, writing
- Kendrick Lamar – vocals, writing
- Giane Chenheu – writing, production
- Brandon Burton – writing
- Angus Fairbairn – writing
- Kacy Hill – writing
- Robert Moose – writing
- James Stack – writing
- Justin Vernon – writing

Technicians

- Mark Kraus – assistant engineer
- Demitrius Lewis II – assistant engineer
- Nicholas De Porcel – mastering engineer
- James Hunt – mixing, recording engineer
- Robbie Soukiasyan – recording engineer

== Charts ==
Chart (2023)	Peak position
Canada Hot 100 (Billboard)	80
New Zealand Hot Singles (RMNZ)	14
US Billboard Hot 100	93
US Hot R&B/Hip-Hop Songs (Billboard)	34
US Rhythmic Airplay (Billboard)	27

== Release history ==
Region	Date	Format	Label	Ref.
Various	May 30, 2023	YouTube	PGLang; Columbia	
Various	June 2, 2023	Tidal	PGLang; Columbia	
Various	June 5, 2023	Digital download; streaming	PGLang; Columbia	
United States	June 20, 2023	Urban radio	PGLang; Columbia	
