= PGLang =

American creative communications company

pgLang, LLC
- Type: Private
- Industry: Entertainment
- Founded: March 5, 2020; 6 years ago
- Founders: Kendrick Lamar; Dave Free
- Headquarters: Los Angeles, California, U.S.
- Area served: Worldwide
- Products: Music; films; television; art; books; podcasts; clothing
- Services: Artist management; music production; film production; advertising; publishing; Project 3
- Owners: Kendrick Lamar; Dave Free
- Website: pg-lang.com

pgLang (an abbreviation for "program language") is an American independent multidisciplinary creative communications company headquartered in Los Angeles. Founded and owned by Kendrick Lamar and Dave Free, it specializes in music and visual media production. The company has won six Cannes Lions Awards, including the Special Award for Independent Agency of the Year – Craft in 2023.

== History ==
=== 2019–2021: Background and launch ===
American rapper Kendrick Lamar and American filmmaker Dave Free are creative partners who met while they were in high school. They signed to independent record label Top Dawg Entertainment (TDE) in the early 2000s; Free later assumed the role as the label's co-president, while Lamar became a minority shareholder. Through TDE, they formed the filmmaking duo the Little Homies and directed music videos. On October 4, 2019, Rolling Stone reported that Free had departed TDE and was working independently with rapper Baby Keem. Lamar later announced that he would also end his tenure with TDE through the release of his fifth studio album.

Lamar and Free formally launched pgLang on March 5, 2020, which was described as a "multilingual, artist-friendly, at service company." The company's mission statement reads:

pgLang is multilingual. Our community speaks music, film, television, art, books, and podcasts — because sometimes we have to use different languages to get the point of our stories across. Stories that speak to many nations, many races, and many ages. That is why our writers, singers, directors, musicians, and producers break formats when we build ideas and make them real for the curious. Putting round pegs through square holes is not a process, but we embrace the idea of anarchy and challenges that make us stronger. PGLang is focused on using our experiences, and nurturing our many collaborators, to build stories that are equally accessible and engaging then fitting them within the best media.

In a separate press release, Free clarified that pgLang "is not a record label, a movie studio, or a publishing house. This is something new. In this overstimulated time, we are focused on cultivating raw expression from grassroots partnerships." He considers pgLang to be a communications company, explaining: "we tell stories; we communicate between artists and establishments; we communicate that taste is interchangeable between fields." Free stressed the importance of branding pgLang correctly to allow the company to be ambiguous, which gives him and Lamar "more room to grow and experiment. Creative companies haven't really worked like this before because they usually have a specific story and aesthetic, but we are taking a different approach."

On January 13, 2021, pgLang launched an advertising campaign for fashion house Calvin Klein, with a series of seven short films written and directed by Free. The short films starred Baby Keem, Brent Faiyaz, and Travis Bennett, among others. Through his joint contract with Columbia Records, Baby Keem released his debut album, The Melodic Blue, on September 10, 2021. The album received generally positive reviews from music critics and debuted at number five on the Billboard 200. Its single, "Family Ties" with Lamar, won the Grammy Award for Best Rap Performance.

=== 2022–present: Breakthrough, brand collaborations and Project 3 ===
On January 13, 2022, Deadline Hollywood reported that Lamar and Free were producing a comedy feature film through pgLang, in a partnership with South Park creators Matt Stone and Trey Parker, for Paramount Pictures. The untitled film was scheduled released in theaters on July 4, 2025, in a nod to American Independence Day. However, following Lamar's active touring schedule, the movie has been postponed indefinitely with a release date currently not set. The company announced the signing of rapper Tanna Leone on March 9, under the aegis of Def Jam Recordings. He released his debut album, Sleepy Soldier, on April 27, 2022. pgLang launched a footwear collaboration and advertising campaign for lifestyle brand Converse on May 2, 2022, which starred Leone and Selah Marley.

Lamar released his fifth album, Mr. Morale & the Big Steppers, on May 13, 2022. Receiving critical acclaim, the album debuted atop the Billboard 200 and was later awarded the Grammy Award for Best Rap Album. pgLang presented its accompanying tour, the Big Steppers Tour, through a partnership with Cash App and Amazon Music. The tour premiered an advertising campaign co-starring Lamar and Ray Dalio for Cash App, which won a Webby Award for Top Scripted (Branded) Video, and the short film adaptation of "We Cry Together", a song by Lamar and Taylour Paige. A concert film documenting the tour, Kendrick Lamar Live: The Big Steppers Tour, was released through Amazon Prime Video on November 23, 2022. pgLang partnered with Spotify and non-governmental organization Surf Ghana to open Vibrate Space, a community recording studio and music business program in Accra.

pgLang won six awards during the 2023 Cannes Lions International Festival of Creativity, including the Film Craft Grand Prix for Direction and the Special Award for Independent Agency of the Year – Craft. In November 2023, the company released their second footwear collaboration with Converse and their first mobile phone collaboration with Light Phone. Dominic Fike and Baby Keem starred in the advertising campaign for Converse. pgLang announced a five-year partnership with Global Citizen to establish and curate Move Afrika: A Global Citizen Experience, the first major touring circuit across the African continent.

Lamar unexpectedly announced The Pop Out: Ken & Friends two weeks prior to the event. It was a one-off concert held at the Kia Forum in Inglewood, California, on June 19, 2024. The Juneteenth and Black Music Month celebration marked Lamar's first major performance following his highly publicized feud with Canadian rapper Drake. Its set list consisted of about 60 songs predominantly conceived by musicians based in the Greater Los Angeles area. Spanning over three hours, over 25 West Coast artists were featured during the event, including opening acts DJ Hed and Mustard, Ty Dolla Sign, Dom Kennedy, Steve Lacy, Tyler, the Creator, Roddy Ricch, YG, Schoolboy Q, Jay Rock, Ab-Soul, and Dr. Dre. Lamar performed four of his five Drake-aimed diss tracks, "Like That", "Euphoria", "6:16 in LA" and "Not Like Us", for the first time during his headlining set; the latter track was performed five consecutive times. After witnessing an exceedingly high demand in tickets, Amazon Music live-streamed the Pop Out through Prime Video and Twitch. A total of 16,000 fans were in attendance for the event. The impromptu concert received widespread acclaim from critics, who hailed it as a cultural landmark for West Coast hip hop and Lamar's legacy. It currently holds the record for the most minutes watched of any video production distributed by Amazon Music.

On November 22, 2024, Kendrick Lamar released GNX, his sixth album and second under pgLang. Titled after the Buick Regal model and following his feud with Drake, GNX is Lamar's first album to be released after his departure from longtime labels Top Dawg Entertainment and Aftermath Entertainment.

On September 8, 2024, the NFL, Apple Music and Roc Nation announced Lamar as the headlining act for the Super Bowl LIX halftime show. He is the first rapper to lead the festivities multiple times. Lamar shared the news by posting a promotional trailer on YouTube, which was directed by his long-time creative partner Dave Free. The one-shot trailer shows him on a football field in front of a large American flag throwing footballs through a passing machine at off-screen players. As he shouts motivational remarks to them, he introduces himself as the headliner. In the video announcing his selection, Lamar said "You know it's only one opportunity to win a championship. No round twos", which was interpreted as a shot against Drake, who posted a few weeks before that "we will win Game 2". Speculation arose as to whether he would incorporate "Not Like Us" into his performance. On January 23, 2025, it was announced that SZA would be joining as a special guest. The Super Bowl LIX halftime show, officially known as the Apple Music Super Bowl LIX Halftime Show for sponsorship reasons, was the halftime entertainment of Super Bowl LIX, which took place on February 9, 2025, at the Caesars Superdome in New Orleans, Louisiana. It featured guest appearances from singer-songwriter SZA, actor Samuel L. Jackson, tennis player Serena Williams, along with DJ and record producer Mustard. The show was televised nationally in the U.S. by Fox and Fox Deportes, with streaming available via Tubi and NFL+. The performance was seen by a combined 133.5 million viewers domestically across all platforms, surpassing Michael Jackson's performance at Super Bowl XXVII in 1993 as the most viewed halftime show in the United States.

On March 18, 2025, American business magazine Fast Company released their "annual ranking of the world's most innovative companies over 58 industries and sectors, from advertising to video", with pgLang ranked as the 15th overall.

On July 31, 2025, pgLang announced Project 3, their newest branch and creative agency. The announcement was released along with a short film titled The Agency, starring Chase Sui Wonders and Lionel Boyce, directed by Jack Begert, who co-wrote it alongside Dave Free.

On 12 November 2025, Project 3 and ArtScience Museum (within the integrated resort of Marina Bay Sands in the Downtown Core of the Central Area in Singapore) officially announced their partnership, intended for the museum's rebrand and current-to-upcoming shows.

On 10 February 2026, Baby Keem announced his second studio album, titled Ca$ino, via Instagram, set to be released ten days later on February 20th, also revealing the album cover and announcing the availability of a limited edition vinyl release. To accompany the announcement, Keem shared a short documentary film titled "Booman I" on YouTube. The media contains video clips of Keem in the studio, showing personal videos and interviews with his family, including his cousin Kendrick Lamar. The nearly 10-minute video clip was directed by Alexandre Moors and LaConnie Govan, it was co-produced by Lamar, Dave Free, and the duo's label pgLang, along with Eerie Times, and in association with Good Company.

On March 19, 2026, pgLang along with Project 3, partnered with Adidas, for an exclusive event at the Lower Grand Tunnel in Los Angeles, called the "Three Lanes", which featured live performances from Baby Keem and Kaytranada, as well as the unveiling and promotion of the special edition Adidas Originals away kit designs that the sportswear brand manufactured for 25 national soccer teams, those set to premiere and to be worn during the 2026 FIFA World Cup.

On 2 June 2026, R&B singer Imani Imani, also known as Imani Selina, surprise released her debut album Papercut, and was officially announced as the latest signee of the label, after being formally signed in 2024, when work began in the project.

== Roster ==
Act	Year signed	Releases under pgLang	Notes
Kendrick Lamar	Founder	2	Jointly with Interscope
Baby Keem	2020	2	Jointly with Columbia
Tanna Leone	2022	1	Jointly with Def Jam
Imani Imani	2024	1	Jointly with Interscope

== Discography ==
=== Studio albums ===
Artist	Album	Details
Baby Keem	The Melodic Blue	Released: September 10, 2021; Label: pgLang, Columbia; Format: Digital download, streaming, LP; Charts: US #5; Certifications: RIAA Platinum
Tanna Leone	Sleepy Soldier	Released: April 27, 2022; Label: pgLang, Def Jam; Format: Digital download, streaming, LP; Charts: —; Certifications: —
Kendrick Lamar	Mr. Morale & the Big Steppers	Released: May 13, 2022; Label: pgLang, Top Dawg, Aftermath, Interscope; Format: Digital download, streaming, CD, LP; Charts: US #1; Certifications: —
Baby Keem	The Melodic Blue (Deluxe)	Released: October 28, 2022; Label: pgLang, Columbia; Format: Digital download, streaming; Charts: —; Certifications: —
Kendrick Lamar	GNX	Released: November 22, 2024; Label: pgLang, Interscope; Format: Digital download, streaming, CD, LP; Charts: US #1; Certifications: —
Baby Keem	Ca$ino	Released: February 20, 2026; Label: pgLang, Columbia; Format: Digital download, streaming, CD, LP; Charts: US #4; Certifications: —
Imani Imani	Papercut	Released: June 2, 2026; Label: pgLang, Interscope; Format: Digital download, streaming; Charts: —; Certifications: —

== Filmography ==
=== Films ===
Year	Film	Director(s)	Notes	Distributor
2022	We Cry Together	Kendrick Lamar; Dave Free; Jake Schreier	Short film	Top Dawg Entertainment; Aftermath Entertainment; Interscope Records
2022	Kendrick Lamar Live: The Big Steppers Tour	Mike Carson; Dave Free; Mark A. Ritchie	Concert film	Amazon Studios
2024	The Pop Out: Ken & Friends	Damien Gravois; Mike Carson	Concert film	Amazon Prime Video; Twitch
2025	Apple Music Super Bowl LIX Halftime Show	Hamish Hamilton	Halftime entertainment	National Football League (NFL); Apple Music
2026	Booman I	Alexandre Moors; LaConnie Govan	Documentary film	PGLang; Eerie Times; Good Company
2026	Booman II	Alexandre Moors; LaConnie Govan	Documentary film	PGLang; Eerie Times; Good Company
2026	Booman III	Alexandre Moors; LaConnie Govan	Documentary film	PGLang; Eerie Times; Good Company
TBA	Whitney Springs	Trey Parker	Feature film	Paramount Pictures

=== Music videos ===
Year	Song	Artist(s)	Album	Director(s)
2020	"Hooligan"	Baby Keem	The Melodic Blue	Jake Schreier
2021	"No Sense"	Baby Keem	The Melodic Blue	Savannah Setten
2021	"Durag Activity"	Baby Keem and Travis Scott	The Melodic Blue	Eliel Ford
2021	"Family Ties"	Baby Keem and Kendrick Lamar	The Melodic Blue	Dave Free
2021	The Melodic Blue (album trailer)	Baby Keem	The Melodic Blue	Dave Free
2021	"Issues"	Baby Keem	The Melodic Blue	Jake Schreier
2021	"First Order of Business"	Baby Keem	The Melodic Blue	Dave Free
2022	"16"	Baby Keem	The Melodic Blue	Jonas Lindstroem
2022	"With The Villains"	Tanna Leone	Sleepy Soldier	Neal Farmer
2022	"Death 'N Taxes"	Tanna Leone	Sleepy Soldier	Neal Farmer
2022	"The Heart Part 5"	Kendrick Lamar	Mr. Morale and the Big Steppers	Dave Free; Kendrick Lamar
2022	"N95"	Kendrick Lamar	Mr. Morale and the Big Steppers	Dave Free; Kendrick Lamar
2022	"Picasso"	Tanna Leone	Sleepy Soldier	Medet
2022	"Rich Spirit"	Kendrick Lamar	Mr. Morale and the Big Steppers	Calmatic
2022	"Count Me Out"	Kendrick Lamar	Mr. Morale and the Big Steppers	Dave Free; Kendrick Lamar
2023	"The Hillbillies"	Baby Keem and Kendrick Lamar	—N/a	Neal Farmer
2024	"Not Like Us"	Kendrick Lamar	—N/a	Dave Free; Kendrick Lamar
2024	GNX (album trailer)	Kendrick Lamar	GNX	Dave Free
2024	"Squabble Up"	Kendrick Lamar	GNX	Calmatic
2025	"Luther"	Kendrick Lamar and SZA	GNX	Karena Evans
2026	"Birds & the Bees"	Baby Keem	Ca$ino	Jack Begert
2026	"Good Flirts"	Baby Keem (featuring Kendrick Lamar and Momo Boyd)	Ca$ino	Renell Medrano
2026	"Mindgames"	Imani Imani	Papercut	Keanna Williams; Neal Farmer
2026	"Bet On Me"	Imani Imani	Papercut	Keanna Williams; Neal Farmer
2026	"On Demand"	Imani Imani	Papercut	Keanna Williams; Neal Farmer

=== Advertising campaigns ===
Title	Release date	Director(s)	Star(s)
pgLang for Calvin Klein	January 14, 2021	Dave Free	Mecca Allah; Baby Keem; Jordan Ozuna; Travis Bennett; Ryan Destiny; Keith Powers; Amber Wagner; Danielle Hawkins; Liliana Ruiz; Taija; Brent Faiyaz; ExavierTV; Kassie Leeann
pgLang for Converse	May 2, 2022	Savannah Setten	Tanna Leone; Selah Marley
"The Balcony", pgLang for Cash App	August 14, 2022	Dave Free	Kendrick Lamar; Ray Dalio; ExavierTV
pgLang for Converse	October 23–25, 2023	Jack Begert; Hidji Films	Dominic Fike; Baby Keem
"The Button", pgLang for Chanel	January 20, 2024	Dave Free	Margaret Qualley; Anna Mouglalis; Naomi Campbell
Kendrick Lamar. Super Bowl LIX Halftime Show (promotional trailer)	September 9, 2024	Dave Free	Kendrick Lamar
"The Salon", pgLang for Cash App	November 26, 2024	Calmatic	Angel Reese
Apple Music SBLIX Halftime Show (Official Trailer)	January 23, 2025	—N/a	Kendrick Lamar; SZA
"The Agency" (promotional short film for Project 3 by PGLang)	July 31, 2025	Jack Begert	Chase Sui Wonders; Lionel Boyce
"Shadow Play", Project 3 for Adidas Originals	April 2, 2026		
"Road Work", Project 3 for Adidas Originals	April 2, 2026		
"Pressure", Project 3 for Adidas Originals	April 2, 2026		
"I Spy", Project 3 for Adidas Originals	April 2, 2026		Jude Bellingham
"Dressed Up", Project 3 for Adidas Originals	April 3, 2026		
"Prada Linea Rossa to the Summit", Project 3 for Prada	September 29, 2026	Karim Huu Do	Jake Gyllenhaal

== Accolades ==
Award	Year (Note: Indicates the year of ceremony. Each year is linked to the article about the awards held that year, wherever possible.)	Recipient(s)	Category	Result	Ref.
Webby Awards	2023	"That's Money" (PGLang for Cash App)	Top Scripted (Branded) Video	Won	
Cannes Lions International Festival of Creativity	2023	"The Heart Part 5"	Film Craft Lion for Visual Effects	Bronze Lion	
Cannes Lions International Festival of Creativity	2023	"Balcony" (PGLang for Cash App)	Entertainment Lion for Partnerships with Talent	Bronze Lion	
Cannes Lions International Festival of Creativity	2023	"Balcony" (PGLang for Cash App)	Film Craft Lion for Direction	Bronze Lion	
Cannes Lions International Festival of Creativity	2023	We Cry Together – A Short Film	Film Craft Lion for Direction	Grand Prix	
Cannes Lions International Festival of Creativity	2023	We Cry Together – A Short Film	Film Craft Lion for Cinematography	Gold Lion	
Cannes Lions International Festival of Creativity	2023	pgLang	Independent Agency of the Year – Craft	Won	
Primetime Creative Arts Emmy Awards	2025	The Apple Music Super Bowl LIX Halftime Show Starring Kendrick Lamar (Kendrick Lamar and Tony Russell)	Outstanding Music Direction	Won	
NAACP Image Awards	2026	The Apple Music Super Bowl LIX Halftime Show Starring Kendrick Lamar	Outstanding Short-Form Series or Special - Reality/Nonfiction/Documentary	Won	
