= The Big Steppers Tour =

2022–2024 concert tour by Kendrick Lamar

- World tour by Kendrick Lamar
- Location: Africa; Asia; Europe; North America; Oceania; South America
- Associated album: Mr. Morale & the Big Steppers
- Start date: June 23, 2022
- End date: March 23, 2024
- Legs: 4
- No. of shows: 103
- Supporting acts: Baby Keem; Tanna Leone
- Box office: $110.8 million (73 shows)
- Website: oklama.com/tour

Kendrick Lamar concert chronology
- The Championship Tour (2018); The Big Steppers Tour (2022–24); The Pop Out: Ken & Friends (2024)

The Big Steppers Tour was the fourth solo concert tour by American rapper Kendrick Lamar, in support of his fifth studio album, Mr. Morale & the Big Steppers (2022). It was his first concert tour and second arena-driven tour after The Damn Tour. Visualized and formatted by PGLang, Lamar announced the tour hours after the release of Mr. Morale & the Big Steppers. It began on June 23, 2022, in Milan, Italy, and concluded on March 23, 2024, in Mexico City, Mexico, consisting of 103 shows across six continents. 75 of those shows were held in arenas, while 28 were headlining performances at music festivals.

Described as a form of 21st century hip hop opera, the Big Steppers Tour reflects key themes of Mr. Morale & the Big Steppers through its incorporation of minimalist aesthetics and performance art. Narrated by English actor Helen Mirren, the tour follows the album's titular character, Mr. Morale, as he attempts to escape his comfort zone with the assistance of his therapist. Light art, additional props and shadow play are heavily utilized throughout the performance as tools to enhance its storytelling aspects.

The Big Steppers Tour received rave reviews from critics, who commonly labeled it as Lamar's best and most realized tour to date. His stoic performance, concept and high art-inspired stage production were the primary subjects of universal praise. Damien Morris of The Observer considers the tour to be the greatest hip hop show of all time, writing that Lamar "takes the opportunity that his 'Greatest Rapper Alive' status affords to experiment with form, content and stagecraft in ways that the culture has not seen before". An accompanying concert film, Kendrick Lamar Live: The Big Steppers Tour, was released to Amazon Prime Video on November 23, 2022. Earning a total revenue of almost $111 million across 73 shows, the Big Steppers Tour was the highest-grossing rap tour of all time, until it was surpassed by Travis Scott's Circus Maximus Tour (2023–2025).

== Background ==
On November 12, 2021, American rapper Kendrick Lamar headlined Day N Vegas festival, which marked his first live performance in two years and featured a "theatrical exhibition of his musical eras". On February 13, 2022, Lamar co-headlined the Super Bowl LVI halftime show. Three days later, he was announced as a headliner for the Milano Summer Festival. The following month, he was announced as a headliner for Rolling Loud and Glastonbury Festival.

On May 13, immediately following the release of his fifth studio album Mr. Morale & the Big Steppers, Lamar formally announced the Big Steppers Tour by sharing its promotional poster on Twitter, with Baby Keem and Tanna Leone serving as the opening acts. On May 19, the tour's promoter Live Nation Entertainment and one of its sponsors Cash App held a presale for their "Cash Card" cardholders. Tickets for the general public went on sale the following day. Additional dates were added in Los Angeles and Ontario, California, Melbourne, Sydney, Amsterdam, Paris, London, and Dublin following the sales. It was noted in Sounds From Nowhere's review of the European closer at Manchester's AO Arena that Lamar and Baby Keem spent time recording their performance to "take back to L.A" as Lamar put it, potentially for a music video.

== Concert synopsis ==
The show begins with the main section of the stage being covered under a white curtain. As the opening lines from "United in Grief" echo throughout the arena, the eleven dancers emerge onto the catwalk. The men, dressed in black, and the women, dressed in white, make their way towards the main section to the instrumental of "Savior (Interlude)". Once the drape raises, the male dancers leave the stage; the female dancers slowly walk to the main section and pose on a bed. Mr. Morale is seen sitting at a piano with a small puppet resembling him resting on top. He performs the first verse of "United in Grief" before he and his puppet walk towards the middle stage. After a small pause, he continues the song by performing the chorus and second verse using ventriloquism.

After the song ends, Mr. Morale's therapist, voiced by actor Helen Mirren, introduces herself as his guide throughout the performance. She informs him that he's been living in his comfort zone, or box, for over 1,855 days (the period of time between the releases of his fourth and fifth studio albums) and that it was time for him to leave that space. He then performs "N95" with pyrotechnics and "Element" with his silhouette shown against the lowered curtain. Using the introduction from rapper Kodak Black, Mr. Morale performs the first and second verses of "Worldwide Steppers" with shadow play appearing on the curtain. He immediately performs "Backseat Freestyle" and "Rich Spirit" as the curtain rises once more. After skipping his way towards the main stage to the instrumental of "Rich (Interlude)", Mirren tells Mr. Morale that he's "once again let your ego get the best of you" before asking if she needed to remind him of "how this went before". He plays the melody of "Humble" on the piano before performing the full song and descending the main stage.

Using the opening dialogue between himself and his longtime partner Whitney Alford, Mr. Morale is raised back onto the main stage sitting in a chair while performing the first and part of the second verses of "Father Time". Mirren shows sympathy for him, acknowledging that she can't blame him for "being a product of your environment", but advises him that it's "up to you to maneuver through it at this point". Mr. Morale then performs "M.A.A.D city" with some of the dancers, flashlights and additional pyrotechnics. The curtain lowers again before showing a silhouette of Mr. Morale arguing with a woman to the chorus of "We Cry Together". Now on the middle stage, he formally welcomes the audience to the show and performs the chorus and first verse of "Purple Hearts". As he's performing, the silhouetted couple works through their argument and embraces at the end.

After performing "King Kunta", Mr. Morale decides to "check the temperature" of the audience by performing a mashup of "Loyalty" and "Swimming Pools (Drank)". He deems the audience ready to continue and performs the remix of "Bitch, Don't Kill My Vibe" with a female dancer performing a solo piece behind him. Three more female dancers join him as he performs "Die Hard". They all make their way towards the main stage as the four dancers perform a group piece to "Lust" while Mr. Morale lays in a bed. As he descends the stage, the curtain lowers once more and shows a silhouette that mirrored moving sunlight. Mirren condemns Mr. Morale, telling him that he "did this to himself again". She suggests that he's forgotten who he is and asks if he needed a reminder from her before continuing the performance. Mr. Morale responds by performing "DNA" and is advised by Mirren that in order "to move further, first you have to get past yourself".

Experiencing a breakthrough in his journey, Mr. Morale performs "Count Me Out". During the first verse, he's hunched over with his silhouette, whose back is pierced with arrows, appearing on the lowered curtain. He continues the song with all of his dancers before performing its outro by himself. After a small pause, he performs "Money Trees" and "Love" on the lower stage. Mr. Morale is then enclosed in a small box with four male dancers, each wearing hazmat suits. He is then instructed by Mirren to take a COVID-19 test, assuring him that it's "for your own good". After performing "Alright", Mirren then asks the audience if they were entertained before informing Mr. Morale that he has been contaminated. Smoke begins to seep into the box; Mirren assures him that it wasn't lethal. Still enclosed in the box, Mr. Morale is elevated into the air while performing "Mirror". He breaks free from the box and performs the chorus and first verse of "Silent Hill". As he's lowered back down, Baby Keem appears on the main stage to perform a mashup of "Vent" and "Range Brothers" before performing a portion of "Family Ties". As Mr. Morale heads back to the main stage, Mirren tells him that the audience seems to follow him now and warns him that "with great power comes great responsibility". He performs "Crown" while playing the piano before being joined by Tanna Leone and all of the dancers to perform "Mr. Morale". "Savior" is the concluding song of the show, where Mr. Morale thanks the audience for attending and flashes a smile as he exits the stage and the curtain is lowered for the final time. Mirren congratulates him for making it out of the box before asking if he can stay out.

== Stage and aesthetic ==
During the North American leg, Lamar wore custom costumes from Louis Vuitton on stage; they were similar to the outfit he wore while co-headlining the Super Bowl LVI halftime show. Each piece was taken from Virgil Abloh's final menswear collection as Louis Vuitton's artistic director before his death in November 2021. Lamar also sported pendants and earrings from Tiffany & Co., sunglasses from Gentle Monster which were designed by Jennie Kim of Blackpink, and a diamond encrusted glove on his right hand. The gloves resembles the one commonly worn by Michael Jackson. For his homecoming performances in Los Angeles, Lamar wore a Taz Arnold designed white suit painted with pink-red graffiti that honored his hometown of Compton. During the European leg, he wore custom costumes designed by Mexican artist Arlette and British-Jamaican designer Martine Rose.

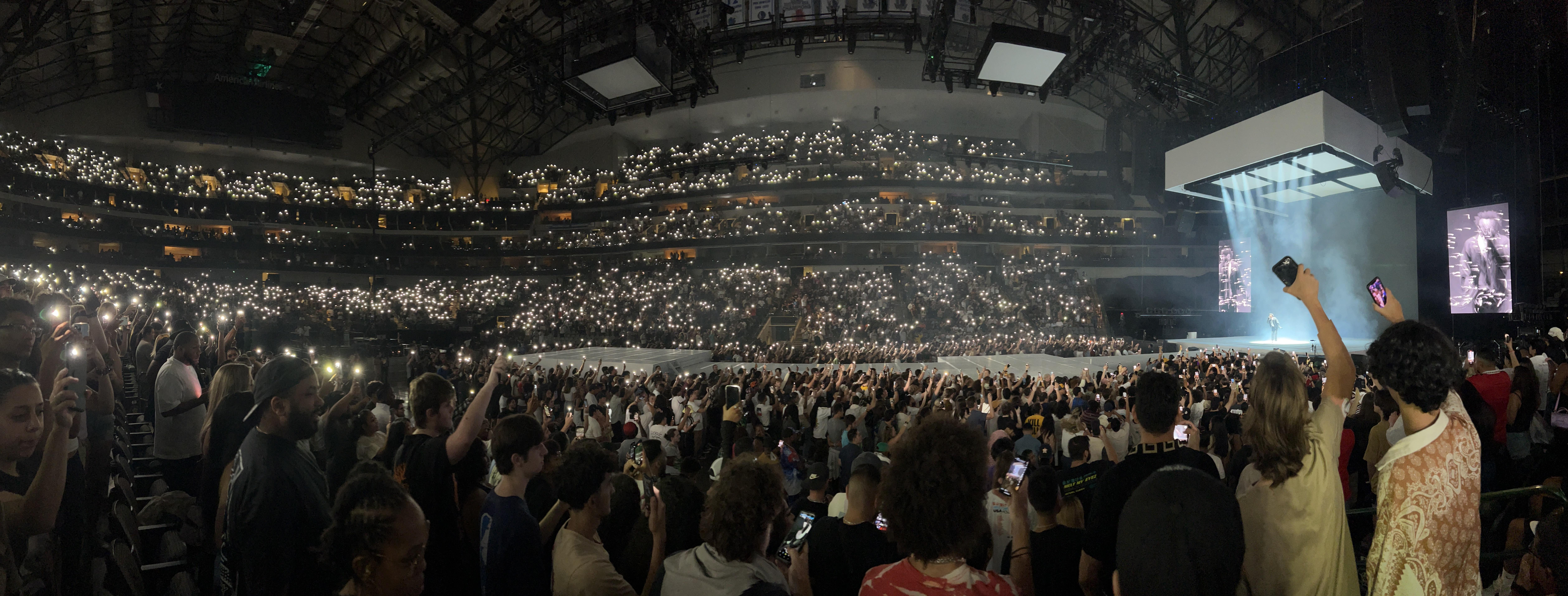
Baby Keem on stage as seen at the Dallas show

As the lead creative director, Lamar enlisted his close collaborators Dave Free and Mike Carson as key creatives, Tony Russell as the music director, Charm La'Donna as the lead choreographer, and Christopher Latouche as the story artist. Eleven dancers, seven men and four women, are featured in the performance. The "intense" choreography included two-stepping that resembles "divine nine step shows".

The minimalist all white stage design was separated into three sections: a main stage periodically draped with a white curtain, a middle stage, and a lower stage that additionally functions as a mirrored elevator. The three stages are connected by a white catwalk and were intentionally designed to resemble a therapist's office. The tour experiments with light art, shadow play, pyrotechnics and additional props throughout the performance.

== Critical reception ==
The Big Steppers Tour was met with widespread acclaim from critics, who praised Lamar's performance, concept and stage production. Taiyo Coates of Variety described the show as "performance art at its pinnacle" and that Lamar proves "yet again that his elevated artistry carves an unobstructed path to hip hop's Mount Rushmore". Chris Kelly of The Washington Post called the tour a "theatrical spectacle that rewrote the rules of the rap show in the same way that Lamar has rewritten the rules of rap itself". Bryson "Boom" Paul of Consequence lauded the show's "display of militant precision. Lamar was in sequence with the artistically expressive backdrop, while the impeccable timing of the dancers in unison never missed a step." He also described the overall performance as a "two-hour therapy session, redemption odyssey, and play rolled into one. Fans left the show immensely satisfied. It was must-see experience, period."

Writing for Complex, Andre Gee hailed Lamar as a "stoic performer, leaning on the full scope of the live show to keep fans entertained". He elaborates by writing "the genius of [Lamar's] live show is how he maneuvers the stage with no wasted motion. While some MC's continuously run from side to side, jumping around the stage, [Lamar] moves methodically." Gee further writes that Lamar "knew all eyes were on him, and he did exactly what it took to keep it that way, all without over-exerting himself during the marathon set. Even when he was two-stepping, you soon realized he was just stylishly moving to another part of the stage for the next song." Robyn Mowatt of Okayplayer wrote that the tour "isn't just a rap show, it's an expansive experience. Reckoning with what you’ve pulled from his latest album should lead you to understand why Lamar is a pioneering hip hop figure."

Mikael Wood of the Los Angeles Times praised how Lamar blended the "meditative" songs on his recent studio album with the "rowdy old bangers" present in his previous works, which "served to demonstrate the intellectual ambition of even his most radio-friendly songs". He then wrote that the "most gratifying" part of the performance was Lamar's dancing, which he described as a "series of subtle little glide-and-shimmy moves that made him [look like] somebody's cool uncle turning up right on time to the family cookout". Wood suggested that the description was what Lamar ultimately thought of himself during the performance, "not a hero. Not an idol. Just a guy who's learned how best to carry himself."

Steve Baltin of Forbes noted that the last time he personally saw Lamar perform was at a private party for Kobe Bryant's jersey retirement ceremony, where Lamar performed in front of NBA legends such as Bryant, Bill Russell, Magic Johnson, Jerry West, and Kareem Abdul-Jabbar. After watching Lamar's homecoming performance in Los Angeles, Baltin pieced together why he "was the perfect artist to perform for all those NBA greats", because, like them, "Lamar is clearly driven by the quest for greatness. From the opening, [he] performed with the fire and intensity of an athlete determined to bring home the championship on this night." Baltin further praised Lamar's stage presence, expressing that it's why he "has risen to the absolute pinnacle of his musical generation. While others are trying for TikTok followers or staying stupid things like, 'Doing it for the 'Gram', Lamar is chasing true artistry not for fame or fortune, but for the desire within to see what he can accomplish. Driven by that internal push, the way great athletes are, he showed at Crypto.com he can reach true artistic greatness. He displayed that again and again throughout the two hours, doing it with style and fervor consistently."

== Concert film ==
On October 18, 2022, Lamar and Amazon Studios announced that his second performance at Accor Arena in Paris would be livestreamed through Amazon Music's Twitch channel to commemorate the ten-year anniversary of the release of his second studio album Good Kid, M.A.A.D City (2012). The livestream featured Baby Keem and Leone's respective opening performances, and was directed by Mike Carson, Dave Free and Mark A. Ritchie. A director's cut of Lamar's performance was released as a concert film, titled Kendrick Lamar Live: The Big Steppers Tour, exclusively to Amazon Prime Video on November 23.

== Personnel ==
Credits adapted from Mike Carson.

Production

- Kendrick Lamar – executive producer, stage designer, show director
- Dave Free – executive producer, stage designer, show director
- Mike Carson – stage designer, show director
- Christian Coffey – tour director
- Bryan Scheckel – production manager

Choreography

- Charm La'Donna – head of choreography
- Cassidy Ratliff – assistant choreographer

Music direction

- Tony Russell – music director, audio producer
- Joey Muraoka – playback engineer
- Christopher Lee – monitor engineer

Lighting

- Cory Fitzgerald – creative producer, lighting designer
- Marcus Jessup Jr. – lighting director
- Sam Paine – lighting programmer
- Davey Martinez – additional programmer

Camera operation

- Danny Perdue – media server programmer and operator
- Damien Gravois – IMAG director
- Reed Choinski – Steadicam operator

Content and visual effects

- Amish Dani – content producer
- Eddie Perez – animator, visual effects artist
- Chaz Smedley – screen content creator
- Brandon Delgadillo – content creator
- Christopher Latouche – animator

Wardrobe

- Taylor McNeil – stylist (for Lamar)
- Shannon Stokes – stylist (for dancers)
- Belle Abuyo – wardrobe supervisor
- Alexis Avila – wardrobe stylist

Dancers

- Jaheem "FaceOff" Alleyne
- Camryn Bridges
- Jaida Brooks
- Rob Bynes
- Christian Davis
- James Dhaïti
- Joya Jackson
- D-Ran Neal
- Jackie Pipkins
- Alekz Samone
- Corey Turner

== Set list ==
This set list is from the concert on August 13, 2022, in Toronto. It is not intended to represent all shows from the tour.

1. "United in Grief"
2. "N95"
3. "ELEMENT."
4. "Worldwide Steppers"
5. "Backseat Freestyle"
6. "Rich Spirit"
7. "HUMBLE."
8. "Father Time"
9. "m.A.A.d city"
10. "Purple Hearts"
11. "King Kunta"
12. "LOYALTY." / Swimming Pools (Drank)"
13. "Bitch, Don't Kill My Vibe" (Remix)
14. "Die Hard"
15. "LUST." / "DNA."
16. "Count Me Out"
17. "Money Trees"
18. "LOVE."
19. "Alright"
20. "Mirror"
21. "Silent Hill"
22. "Vent" / "Range Brothers" (with Baby Keem)
23. "Family Ties" (with Baby Keem)
24. "Crown"
25. "Mr. Morale" (with Tanna Leone)
26. "Savior"

=== Glastonbury Festival ===
1. "United in Grief"
2. "m.A.A.d city"
3. "Money Trees"
4. "Backseat Freestyle"
5. "Swimming Pools (Drank)"
6. "Poetic Justice"
7. "Bitch, Don't Kill My Vibe" (Remix)
8. "N95"
9. "Count Me Out"
10. "King Kunta"
11. "I"
12. "Alright"
13. "Institutionalized"
14. "The Blacker the Berry"
15. "DNA."
16. "ELEMENT."
17. "Silent Hill"
18. "LOYALTY."
19. "HUMBLE."
20. "LOVE."
21. "Savior"

=== Notes ===
- During the show in Oklahoma City, Lamar performed the final verse of "Auntie Diaries". The instrumental version of the song was played during the shows in Austin, Houston and Dallas.
- Starting with the show in Frankfurt, "Range Brothers" was removed from the set list and replaced with "A Life of Pain".

== Tour dates ==
List of 2022 concertsshowing date, city, country, venue, opening acts, tickets sold, number of available tickets and gross revenue
| Date (2022) | City | Country | Venue | Opening acts | Attendance | Revenue |
|---|---|---|---|---|---|---|
| June 23 (Note: This concert was a part of the Milano Summer Festival.) | Milan | Italy | Ippodromo SNAI San Siro | —N/a | | |
| June 26 (Note: This concert was a part of Glastonbury Festival.) | Pilton | England | Worthy Farm | —N/a | | |
| July 19 | Oklahoma City | United States | Paycom Center | Baby Keem; Tanna Leone | 9,967 / 10,633 | $1,131,269 |
| July 21 | Austin | United States | Moody Center | Baby Keem; Tanna Leone | 10,219 / 10,219 | $1,577,084 |
| July 22 | Houston | United States | Toyota Center | Baby Keem; Tanna Leone | 11,783 / 11,783 | $1,750,794 |
| July 23 | Dallas | United States | American Airlines Center | Baby Keem; Tanna Leone | 12,178 / 12,178 | $2,005,083 |
| July 24 (Note: This concert was a part of Rolling Loud.) | Miami Gardens | United States | Hard Rock Stadium | —N/a | | |
| July 27 | Tampa | United States | Amalie Arena | Baby Keem; Tanna Leone | 11,965 / 12,471 | $1,492,032 |
| July 29 | New Orleans | United States | Smoothie King Center | Baby Keem; Tanna Leone | 12,481 / 12,481 | $1,695,384 |
| July 30 | Atlanta | United States | State Farm Arena | Baby Keem; Tanna Leone | 12,427 / 12,427 | $1,816,858 |
| July 31 | Nashville | United States | Bridgestone Arena | Baby Keem; Tanna Leone | 13,342 / 13,639 | $1,489,160 |
| August 2 | Charlotte | United States | Spectrum Center | Baby Keem; Tanna Leone | 11,653 / 11,653 | $1,584,154 |
| August 4 | Washington, D.C. | United States | Capital One Arena | Baby Keem; Tanna Leone | 13,420 / 14,190 | $2,028,940 |
| August 5 | Brooklyn | United States | Barclays Center | Baby Keem; Tanna Leone | 24,758 / 24,758 | $3,652,750 |
| August 6 | Brooklyn | United States | Barclays Center | Baby Keem; Tanna Leone | 24,758 / 24,758 | $3,652,750 |
| August 7 | Elmont | United States | UBS Arena | Baby Keem; Tanna Leone | 12,875 / 12,875 | $1,462,939 |
| August 9 | Philadelphia | United States | Wells Fargo Center | Baby Keem; Tanna Leone | 12,451 / 12,451 | $1,723,306 |
| August 10 | Boston | United States | TD Garden | Baby Keem; Tanna Leone | 12,983 / 12,983 | $1,911,584 |
| August 12 | Toronto | Canada | Scotiabank Arena | Baby Keem; Tanna Leone | 28,046 / 28,046 | $3,158,604 |
| August 13 | Toronto | Canada | Scotiabank Arena | Baby Keem; Tanna Leone | 28,046 / 28,046 | $3,158,604 |
| August 14 | Detroit | United States | Little Caesars Arena | Baby Keem; Tanna Leone | 13,747 / 13,747 | $1,819,963 |
| August 16 | Columbus | United States | Schottenstein Center | Baby Keem; Tanna Leone | 11,991 / 11,991 | $1,604,920 |
| August 18 | Milwaukee | United States | Fiserv Forum | Baby Keem; Tanna Leone | 12,109 / 12,109 | $1,765,303 |
| August 19 | Chicago | United States | United Center | Baby Keem; Tanna Leone | 13,656 / 13,656 | $2,060,985 |
| August 20 | Saint Paul | United States | Xcel Energy Center | Baby Keem; Tanna Leone | 13,640 / 13,640 | $1,522,905 |
| August 21 | Kansas City | United States | T-Mobile Center | Baby Keem; Tanna Leone | 12,267 / 12,267 | $1,664,480 |
| August 23 | Denver | United States | Ball Arena | Baby Keem; Tanna Leone | 13,163 / 13,163 | $1,906,982 |
| August 24 | Salt Lake City | United States | Vivint Arena | Baby Keem; Tanna Leone | 11,841 / 11,841 | $1,620,262 |
| August 26 | Portland | United States | Moda Center | Baby Keem; Tanna Leone | 12,709 / 12,709 | $1,689,385 |
| August 27 | Seattle | United States | Climate Pledge Arena | Baby Keem; Tanna Leone | 13,949 / 13,949 | $2,318,964 |
| August 28 | Vancouver | Canada | Rogers Arena | Baby Keem; Tanna Leone | 12,339 / 12,339 | $1,340,262 |
| August 30 | Sacramento | United States | Golden 1 Center | Baby Keem; Tanna Leone | 12,364 / 12,364 | $1,610,876 |
| August 31 | Oakland | United States | Oakland Arena | Baby Keem; Tanna Leone | 24,586 / 24,586 | $3,721,088 |
| September 1 | Oakland | United States | Oakland Arena | Baby Keem; Tanna Leone | 24,586 / 24,586 | $3,721,088 |
| September 6 | San Diego | United States | Viejas Arena | Baby Keem; Tanna Leone | 9,699 / 9,699 | $1,438,826 |
| September 7 | Anaheim | United States | Honda Center | Baby Keem; Tanna Leone | 11,239 / 11,239 | $1,599,294 |
| September 9 | Las Vegas | United States | T-Mobile Arena | Baby Keem; Tanna Leone | 12,338 / 14,231 | $1,727,812 |
| September 10 | Phoenix | United States | Footprint Center | Baby Keem; Tanna Leone | 12,327 / 12,327 | $2,105,421 |
| September 11 | Ontario | United States | Toyota Arena | Baby Keem; Tanna Leone | 7,368 / ? | $1,110,987 |
| September 14 | Los Angeles | United States | Crypto.com Arena | Baby Keem; Tanna Leone | 50,402 / 51,657 | $7,122,758 |
| September 15 | Los Angeles | United States | Crypto.com Arena | Baby Keem; Tanna Leone | 50,402 / 51,657 | $7,122,758 |
| September 16 | Los Angeles | United States | Crypto.com Arena | Baby Keem; Tanna Leone | 50,402 / 51,657 | $7,122,758 |
| September 17 | Los Angeles | United States | Crypto.com Arena | Baby Keem; Tanna Leone | 50,402 / 51,657 | $7,122,758 |
| October 7 | Amsterdam | Netherlands | Ziggo Dome | Baby Keem; Tanna Leone | 31,599 / 31,599 | $2,398,609 |
| October 8 | Amsterdam | Netherlands | Ziggo Dome | Baby Keem; Tanna Leone | 31,599 / 31,599 | $2,398,609 |
| October 10 | Prague | Czech Republic | O_{2} Arena | Baby Keem; Tanna Leone | 12,246 / 12,839 | $825,293 |
| October 11 | Berlin | Germany | Mercedes-Benz Arena | Baby Keem; Tanna Leone | 12,881 / 12,881 | $963,910 |
| October 13 | Hamburg | Germany | Barclays Arena | Baby Keem; Tanna Leone | 11,209 / 11,562 | $845,024 |
| October 15 | Copenhagen | Denmark | Royal Arena | Baby Keem; Tanna Leone | 14,673 / 14,673 | $1,582,329 |
| October 17 | Stockholm | Sweden | Avicii Arena | Baby Keem; Tanna Leone | 13,642 / 13,768 | $1,024,580 |
| October 19 | Oslo | Norway | Telenor Arena | Baby Keem; Tanna Leone | 19,865 / 19,865 | $1,412,661 |
| October 21 | Paris | France | Accor Arena | Baby Keem; Tanna Leone | 30,993 / 30,993 | $2,796,539 |
| October 22 | Paris | France | Accor Arena | Baby Keem; Tanna Leone | 30,993 / 30,993 | $2,796,539 |
| October 24 | Stuttgart | Germany | Hanns-Martin-Schleyer-Halle | Baby Keem; Tanna Leone | 10,437 / 10,617 | $794,515 |
| October 25 | Zürich | Switzerland | Hallenstadion | Baby Keem; Tanna Leone | 13,000 / 13,000 | $1,329,442 |
| October 26 | Lausanne | Switzerland | Vaudoise Aréna | Baby Keem; Tanna Leone | 6,566 / 6,566 | $748,911 |
| October 28 | Antwerp | Belgium | Sportpaleis | Baby Keem; Tanna Leone | 17,624 / 17,624 | $1,314,179 |
| October 30 | Cologne | Germany | Lanxess Arena | Baby Keem; Tanna Leone | 13,563 / 15,063 | $1,042,046 |
| October 31 | Frankfurt | Germany | Festhalle Frankfurt | Baby Keem; Tanna Leone | 10,532 / 10,532 | $802,698 |
| November 2 | Glasgow | Scotland | OVO Hydro | Baby Keem; Tanna Leone | 10,917 / 11,871 | $923,415 |
| November 3 | Leeds | England | First Direct Arena | Baby Keem; Tanna Leone | 11,322 / 11,322 | $1,195,295 |
| November 4 | Newcastle | England | Utilita Arena Newcastle | Baby Keem; Tanna Leone | 10,753 / 10,753 | $1,102,267 |
| November 5 | Birmingham | England | Utilita Arena Birmingham | Baby Keem (Note: Due to illness, Tanna Leone cancelled his appearance for the Birmingham show.) | 11,851 / 11,851 | $1,188,417 |
| November 7 | London | England | The O2 Arena | Baby Keem; Tanna Leone | 48,417 / 48,417 | $5,353,597 |
| November 8 | London | England | The O2 Arena | Baby Keem; Tanna Leone | 48,417 / 48,417 | $5,353,597 |
| November 9 | London | England | The O2 Arena | Baby Keem; Tanna Leone | 48,417 / 48,417 | $5,353,597 |
| November 13 | Dublin | Ireland | 3Arena | Baby Keem; Tanna Leone | 23,418 / 23,418 | $2,412,356 |
| November 14 | Dublin | Ireland | 3Arena | Baby Keem; Tanna Leone | 23,418 / 23,418 | $2,412,356 |
| November 16 | Manchester | England | AO Arena | Baby Keem; Tanna Leone | 13,893 / 13,893 | $1,537,751 |
| November 19 (Note: This concert was a part of Abu Dhabi Grand Prix.) | Abu Dhabi | United Arab Emirates | Etihad Park | —N/a | | |
| December 1 | Perth | Australia | RAC Arena | Baby Keem; Tanna Leone | 12,830 / 12,830 | $1,492,229 |
| December 4 | Melbourne | Australia | Rod Laver Arena | Baby Keem; Tanna Leone | 24,694 / 24,694 | $2,824,879 |
| December 5 | Melbourne | Australia | Rod Laver Arena | Baby Keem; Tanna Leone | 24,694 / 24,694 | $2,824,879 |
| December 8 | Sydney | Australia | Qudos Bank Arena | Baby Keem; Tanna Leone | 28,433 / 28,945 | $3,287,022 |
| December 9 | Sydney | Australia | Qudos Bank Arena | Baby Keem; Tanna Leone | 28,433 / 28,945 | $3,287,022 |
| December 12 | Brisbane | Australia | Brisbane Entertainment Centre | Baby Keem; Tanna Leone | 10,462 / 10,751 | $1,189,894 |
| December 16 | Auckland | New Zealand | Spark Arena | Baby Keem; Tanna Leone | 10,953 / 11,123 | $1,242,939 |

List of 2023 concertsshowing date, city, country, venue, opening acts, tickets sold, number of available tickets and gross revenue
| Date (2023) | City | Country | Venue | Opening acts | Attendance | Revenue |
|---|---|---|---|---|---|---|
| June 2 (Note: This concert was a part of Primavera Sound Barcelona.) | Barcelona | Spain | Parc del Fòrum | —N/a | —N/a | —N/a |
| June 7 (Note: This concert was a part of Primavera Sound Porto.) | Porto | Portugal | Parque da Cidade do Porto | —N/a | —N/a | —N/a |
| June 9 (Note: This concert was a part of Primavera Sound Madrid.) | Madrid | Spain | Arganda del Rey | —N/a | —N/a | —N/a |
| June 11 (Note: This concert was a part of Governors Ball Music Festival.) | Queens | United States | Flushing Meadows–Corona Park | —N/a | —N/a | —N/a |
| June 16 (Note: This concert was a part of Bonnaroo Music Festival.) | Manchester | United States | Great Stage Park | —N/a | —N/a | —N/a |
| June 28 (Note: This concert was a part of Roskilde Festival.) | Roskilde | Denmark | Darupvej | —N/a | —N/a | —N/a |
| June 29 (Note: This concert was a part of Splash!.) | Gräfenhainichen | Germany | Ferropolis | —N/a | —N/a | —N/a |
| June 30 (Note: This concert was a part of Rolling Loud Rotterdam.) | Rotterdam | Netherlands | Rotterdam Ahoy | —N/a | —N/a | —N/a |
| July 1 (Note: This concert was a part of Open'er Festival.) | Gdynia | Poland | Gdynia-Kosakowo Airport | —N/a | —N/a | —N/a |
| July 6 (Note: This concert was a part of Les Ardentes.) | Liège | Belgium | Rue de l'Arbre Courte-Joie | —N/a | —N/a | —N/a |
| July 7 (Note: This concert was a part of Openair Frauenfeld.) | Frauenfeld | Switzerland | Grosse Allmend | —N/a | —N/a | —N/a |
| July 8 (Note: This concert was a part of Rolling Loud Germany.) | Munich | Germany | Messe München | —N/a | —N/a | —N/a |
| July 17 | Verona | Italy | Verona Arena | —N/a | —N/a | —N/a |
| July 23 (Note: This concert was a part of Lollapalooza Paris.) | Paris | France | Hippodrome de Longchamp | —N/a | —N/a | —N/a |
| August 4 (Note: This concert was a part of Lollapalooza.) | Chicago | United States | Grant Park | —N/a | —N/a | —N/a |
| August 6 (Note: This concert was a part of Osheaga Festival.) | Montreal | Canada | Parc Jean-Drapeau | —N/a | —N/a | —N/a |
| August 11 (Note: This concert was a part of Outside Lands Music and Arts Festival.) | San Francisco | United States | Golden Gate Park | —N/a | —N/a | —N/a |
| August 19 (Note: This concert was a part of Summer Sonic Osaka.) | Osaka | Japan | Maishima Sports Island | —N/a | —N/a | —N/a |
| August 20 (Note: This concert was a part of Summer Sonic Tokyo.) | Chiba | Japan | Zozo Marine Stadium | —N/a | —N/a | —N/a |
| September 23 (Note: This concert was a part of Life Is Beautiful Music & Art Festival.) | Las Vegas | United States | Downtown Las Vegas | —N/a | —N/a | —N/a |
| October 6 (Note: This concert was a part of Austin City Limits Music Festival.) | Austin | United States | Zilker Park | —N/a | —N/a | —N/a |
| October 13 | Austin | United States | Zilker Park | —N/a | —N/a | —N/a |
| October 29 (Note: This concert was a part of ONE Music Fest.) | Atlanta | United States | Piedmont Park | —N/a | —N/a | —N/a |
| November 5 (Note: This concert was a part of GPWeek.) | São Paulo | Brazil | Allianz Parque | —N/a | —N/a | —N/a |
| November 11 (Note: This concert was a part of Camp Flog Gnaw Carnival.) (Note: Concert with Baby Keem, billed as the Hillbillies.) | Los Angeles | United States | Dodger Stadium | —N/a | —N/a | —N/a |
| December 6 (Note: This concert was a part of Move Afrika: A Global Citizen Experience.) | Kigali | Rwanda | BK Arena | —N/a | —N/a | —N/a |
| December 9 (Note: This concert was a part of Hey Neighbour Festival.) | Pretoria | South Africa | Legends Adventure Farm | —N/a | —N/a | —N/a |

List of 2024 concertsshowing date, city, country, venue, opening acts, tickets sold, number of available tickets and gross revenue
| Date (2024) | City | Country | Venue | Opening acts | Attendance | Revenue |
|---|---|---|---|---|---|---|
| March 23 (Note: This concert was a part of Festival Ceremonia.) | Mexico City | Mexico | Parque Bicentenario | —N/a | —N/a | —N/a |

=== Cancelled shows ===
List of cancelled concertsshowing date, city, country, venue, reason for cancellation and reference
| Date | City | Country | Venue | Reason | Ref. |
|---|---|---|---|---|---|
| December 17, 2022 | Auckland | New Zealand | Spark Arena | Scheduling conflict | |
| March 29, 2024 (Note: This concert was set to be a part of Pa'l Norte.) | Monterrey | Mexico | Parque Fundidora | Logistical conflict | |
