= Baby Keem =

American rapper and record producer (born 2000)

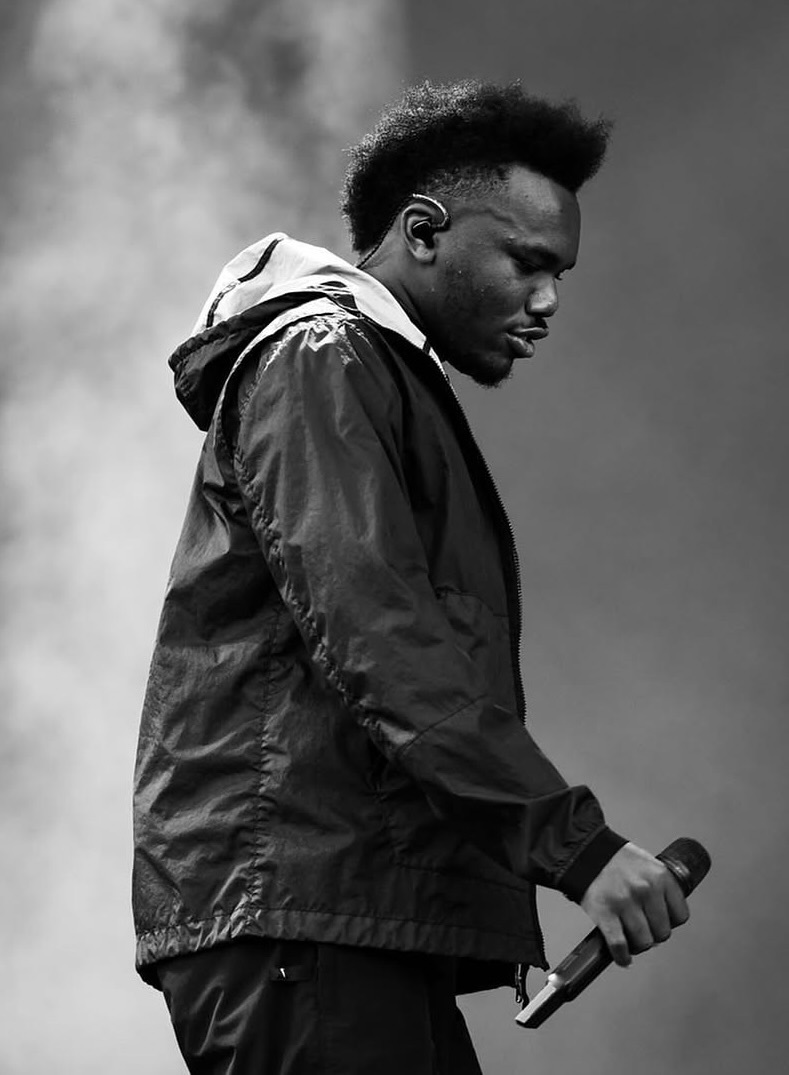
- Carter in 2022

Background information
- Also known as: 2 Phone Baby Keem; Booman; Wyseem; Keem Wasim
- Born: Hykeem Jamaal Carter Jr. October 22, 2000 (age 26); Carson, California, U.S.
- Origin: Las Vegas, Nevada, U.S.
- Genres: West Coast hip-hop; alternative hip-hop; trap; cloud rap; hyphy
- Occupations: Rapper; singer; songwriter; record producer
- Years active: 2016–present
- Labels: The Orchard; Sony; PGLang; Columbia
- Relatives: Kendrick Lamar (cousin); Nick Young (cousin)
- Website: booman.co

Hykeem Jamaal Carter Jr. (born October 22, 2000), known professionally as Baby Keem, is an American rapper and record producer. Raised in Las Vegas, he gained recognition in the late 2010s with his contributions to Black Panther: The Album (2018) by his cousin Kendrick Lamar and The Lion King: The Gift (2019) by Beyoncé. He later achieved breakthrough success with the 2019 sleeper hit "Orange Soda", which received quadruple platinum certification by the Recording Industry Association of America (RIAA).

Keem signed with PGLang, in a joint venture with Columbia Records to release his debut studio album, The Melodic Blue (2021). A critical and commercial success, it peaked at number five on the Billboard 200 and was certified platinum by the RIAA; its single "Family Ties" won Best Rap Performance at the 64th Annual Grammy Awards. His collaborations with Kanye West on Donda (2021) and Lamar on Mr. Morale & the Big Steppers (2022) earned him two nominations for Album of the Year at the 64th and 65th Annual Grammy Awards, respectively. His second studio album, Casino (2026), debuted at number four on the Billboard 200, and also topped the Top R&B/Hip-Hop Albums chart.

== Early life ==
Hykeem Jamaal Carter Jr. was born in 2000, in Carson, California. His mother had issues with alcohol, while his father, Hykeem Carter Sr., was not an active parental figure. Carter was raised between Long Beach, California and Las Vegas, Nevada, by his grandmother until the age of eight, and considers her to be his second mother. Much of his childhood was spent in music studios as he watched his aunts and uncles burn CDs using LimeWire. Carter also underwent eviction and was reliant on food stamps.

Carter was brought up around a musically talented family, where all of his uncles and cousins were rappers. His older cousins include rapper Kendrick Lamar and basketball player Nick Young; he may also be related to rapper Tanna Leone. He always expressed an interest in rapping, but was not confident with his naturally high-pitched voice and chose to wait until it was developed. When he was thirteen, Carter began producing music using Apple software on his computer. At fifteen, he borrowed $300 from his grandmother and purchased a small recording setup for his bedroom on Craigslist. His uncle, who rapped under the stage name Khaotic Lyricist, was an early inspiration for Carter's music. Carter expressed disdain for his hometown where "everybody [knew] everybody", and cited its obsolete music scene as a key factor in his decision to move to Los Angeles. He spent much of his teen years playing video games and "cooking up" in games such as Geometry Dash, Fortnite, and PUBG. He used to post and livestream Minecraft and FIFA gameplay on YouTube and Twitch. Baby Keem attended school and produced music in his Las Vegas bedroom until his breakthrough mixtape, Die for my Bitch, was released. He subsequently moved to Los Angeles to pursue a full-time career in music.

== Career ==
=== 2014–2018: Career beginnings ===
Carter made his first song, "Come Thru", during his freshman year of high school; it was removed from the Internet and he hopes "nobody will ever find it". His first extended play (EP), Oct, was independently released under his birth name on November 7, 2017, but was removed from major streaming media services shortly after its release. According to RapTV, the 9-track EP showed traces of Carter's future musical style by "featuring a mix of bouncy, hard beats and slower, emotional cuts". He released his second EP, Midnight, on January 16, 2018. Although it showcased the same production as Oct, RapTV noticed that Carter's delivery was "more confident and loud". In an interview with Complex, he admitted that Midnight did not have any real artistic direction, and described the project as "just nine songs in my stash that I liked and put out".

After emailing a sample of his production to independent record label Top Dawg Entertainment, Carter contributed to the soundtrack album for the superhero film Black Panther (2018) as a producer. During the summer, he released two EPs, No Name and Hearts and Darts, and produced two songs on Jay Rock's third studio album Redemption. He considers Hearts and Darts, which was his first project under his stage name Baby Keem, to have personality that Midnight lacked. In October 2018, he released his debut mixtape, The Sound of Bad Habit, through the Orchard and Sony Music. The mixtape was executive produced by Cardo.

=== 2019–2020: Die for My Bitch and breakthrough ===
In 2019, Keem released his debut single "Orange Soda". Keem produced two songs on Schoolboy Q's fifth album, Crash Talk (2019). On July 19, 2019, he produced a song for singer Beyoncé's soundtrack album The Lion King: The Gift and released his second mixtape, Die for My Bitch. The alternative hip hop mixtape carried strong pop-punk and alternative rock elements, and received significant media attention. Its lead single, "Orange Soda", became a sleeper hit and helped Keem make his first appearances on the Billboard 200, Billboard Hot 100, and Emerging Artists charts. He supported the mixtape with his first concert tour, the Die for My Bitch Tour, which visited select venues across the US from November 12 to November 20, 2019.

Keem's partnership with creative services company PGLang, founded by Kendrick Lamar and filmmaker Dave Free, was announced through his appearance in the company's visual mission statement on March 5, 2020. He was included on XXL's annual Freshman Class list in August. Upon signing a recording contract with Columbia Records, Keem released the single album "Hooligan / Sons & Critics" on September 18, 2020; the latter song confirmed his familial relation to Lamar after rumors began to emerge. A remix to his debut single “Orange Soda” was released featuring American rapper Rich the Kid in 2020.

=== 2021–2025: The Melodic Blue ===
Keem was featured on Kanye West's song "Praise God" alongside Travis Scott for the former's tenth album, Donda (2021). The Melodic Blue, his debut studio album, was released on September 10, 2021. He co-produced 14 of the album's 16 standard tracks. It received generally positive reviews from music critics, with praise towards its ambitious nature and Keem's growing potential, but criticism towards its "half-baked" production. The album debuted at number five on the Billboard 200, becoming Keem's first top-10 album in the US. Two of the album's four singles, "Durag Activity" with Scott and "Family Ties" with Lamar, enjoyed critical and commercial success. Keem embarked on the Melodic Blue Tour, which visited cities in North America and Europe from November 2021 to July 2022, and appeared on The Tonight Show Starring Jimmy Fallon to promote The Melodic Blue. A B-side to the album was released on September 22, 2021, while the deluxe edition was released on October 28, 2022.

At the 64th Annual Grammy Awards (April 2022), "Family Ties" won Best Rap Performance. Keem produced two songs and was featured on Lamar's fifth album Mr. Morale & the Big Steppers (2022), and served as the co-opening act on the accompanying Big Steppers Tour. He also appeared on the tour's film companion. On May 30, 2023, Keem and Lamar surprise released "The Hillbillies". They headlined the first night of the 2023 Camp Flog Gnaw Carnival as the superduo of the same name. Keem made his acting debut in the short film adaptation of The Melodic Blue, which was released on December 5, 2023. He executive produced the film through his in-house company, Eerie Times.

=== 2026–present: Casino ===
On February 10, 2026, Keem announced his next project, titled Casino, which was released on February 20, 2026, five years after his debut album. Rolling Out described the time between the release of the two albums as "an eternity in modern hip-hop", considering this extended interval "a double-edged sword" for the rapper, between fan anticipation and skepticism about his return to the music scene.

To accompany the album announcement, Keem shared a short documentary, Booman I, on YouTube. Keem is shown in the studio with his family, including his cousin Kendrick Lamar. The video was directed by Alexandre Moors and LaConnie Govan, and it was co-produced by Lamar, Dave Free, and the duo's label PGLang, along with Eerie Times, in association with Good Company. The album contained 12 songs, with Lamar and Momo Boyd featured on "Good Flirts" alongside features from Too Short and Che Ecru.

He embarked on a North American and European tour in support of the album in April 2026, and is scheduled to conclude the tour in September 2026. He is scheduled to headline the June 5, 2026 opening date for the Governors Ball Music Festival, to be held at Flushing Meadows–Corona Park.

== Artistry ==
=== Influences ===
One of Keem's favorite artists and main musical influences is Kid Cudi. He was heavily inspired by his cadences and emotional connection, particularly on the single "Immortal" (2013). As a child, Keem recalled listening to Kanye West's 808s & Heartbreak (2008) during a rare snow day in Las Vegas and being inspired by the album's cinematic quality. He has admitted that he will "never say anything ill" about West, and credits him for consistently challenging music genre boundaries. Keem self-identifies as part of the Mike Will Made It and Metro Boomin generation of record producers, and derives inspiration from both artists. He has also cited XXXTentacion as one of his biggest influences, describing him as his "North Star" and crediting him with shaping the sound of Die for My Bitch through his example of successfully blending singing and rapping. Keem has also cited Lil Uzi Vert as an influence on his music.

== Discography ==
Studio albums

- The Melodic Blue (2021)
- Casino (2026)

== Filmography ==
Film

Year	Title	Role	Notes	Ref.
2022	Kendrick Lamar Live: The Big Steppers Tour	Himself	Concert film	
2023	The Melodic Blue	Himself	Short film; also executive producer	
2026	Booman I	Himself	Documentary film; also executive producer	
2026	Booman II	Himself	Documentary film; also executive producer	
2026	Booman III	Himself	Documentary film; also executive producer	

== Tours ==
Headlining

- Die For My Bitch Tour (2019)
- The Melodic Blue Tour (2021–2022)
- The Casino Tour (2026)

Supporting

- Kendrick Lamar – The Big Steppers Tour (2022)

== Awards and nominations ==
Award	Year	Category	Nominee(s)	Result	Ref.
BET Awards	2022	Best New Artist	Himself	Nominated	
BET Awards	2022	Video of the Year	"Family Ties" (with Kendrick Lamar)	Won	
BET Awards	2022	Best Collaboration	"Family Ties" (with Kendrick Lamar)	Nominated	
BET Awards	2026	Best Collaboration	"Good Flirts" (with Kendrick Lamar and Momo Boyd)	Pending	
BET Awards	2026	Best Male Hip Hop Artist	Himself	Pending	
Billboard Music Awards	2022	Top Gospel Song	"Praise God" (Kanye West featuring Travis Scott and Baby Keem)	Nominated	
Billboard Music Awards	2022	Top Christian Song	"Praise God" (Kanye West featuring Travis Scott and Baby Keem)	Nominated	
Grammy Awards	2022	Best New Artist	Himself	Nominated	
Grammy Awards	2022	Album of the Year	Donda (credited as featured artist and songwriter)	Nominated	
Grammy Awards	2022	Best Rap Performance	"Family Ties" (with Kendrick Lamar)	Won	
Grammy Awards	2022	Best Rap Song	"Family Ties" (with Kendrick Lamar)	Nominated	
Grammy Awards	2023	Album of the Year	Mr. Morale & the Big Steppers (credited as featured artist, songwriter and producer)	Nominated	
Grammy Awards	2024	Best Rap Performance	"The Hillbillies" (with Kendrick Lamar)	Nominated	
Grammy Awards	2025	Best Dance/Electronic Recording	"Leave Me Alone" (with Fred Again)	Nominated	
Grammy Awards	2027	Best Rap Performance	"Good Flirts" (featuring Kendrick Lamar and Momo Boyd)	Pending	
MTV Video Music Awards	2022	Best New Artist	Himself	Nominated	
MTV Video Music Awards	2022	Best Direction	"Family Ties" (with Kendrick Lamar)	Nominated	
MTV Video Music Awards	2022	Best Cinematography	"Family Ties" (with Kendrick Lamar)	Nominated	
MTV Video Music Awards	2022	Best Editing	"Family Ties" (with Kendrick Lamar)	Nominated	
NME Awards	2022	Best Collaboration	"Family Ties" (with Kendrick Lamar)	Nominated	
XXL Awards	2022	Song of the Year	"Family Ties" (with Kendrick Lamar)	Nominated	
XXL Awards	2022	Video of the Year	"Family Ties" (with Kendrick Lamar)	Nominated	
