= The Heart Part 5 =

2022 promotional single by Kendrick Lamar

Promotional single by Kendrick Lamar

from the album Mr. Morale & the Big Steppers
- Released: May 8, 2022
- Genre: Conscious hip-hop
- Length: 5:32
- Label: PGLang; TDE; Aftermath; Interscope
- Songwriters: Kendrick Lamar; Johnny Kosich; Matt Schaeffer; Jake Kosich; Leon Ware; Arthur Ross
- Producer: Beach Noise

Music video
- "The Heart Part 5" on YouTube

"The Heart Part 5" is a song by the American rapper Kendrick Lamar. It was surprise released on May 8, 2022, through PGLang, Top Dawg Entertainment, Aftermath Entertainment and Interscope Records. The song was released as a promotional single to help anticipate the release for Lamar's fifth studio album, Mr. Morale & the Big Steppers, where it was later included as a streaming bonus track. It is the fifth part in his "The Heart" song series, following "The Heart Part 4" in 2017, and his first solo release in over four years.

A conscious hip-hop song with soul and jazz influences, Lamar explores personal themes including empathy, death, and depression from different perspectives, as well as African-American culture and institutionalized discrimination similar to the social commentary approach of To Pimp a Butterfly (2015). In the music video, Lamar stands against a red wall, while his face is used with deepfake technology to resemble six modern Black American figures: O. J. Simpson, Kanye West, Jussie Smollett, Will Smith, Kobe Bryant, and Nipsey Hussle, each performed with a verse from their own perspectives.

"The Heart Part 5" received widespread critical acclaim, with critics praising Lamar's social commentary, the music video's connection to his lyrics, and the song's disco-inspired rhythm. Upon its release, it peaked at number fifteen on the US Billboard Hot 100 and number five on the US Hot R&B/Hip-Hop Songs chart, also appearing in charts from multiple countries. The song received five nominations at the 65th Annual Grammy Awards, including for Record of the Year, Song of the Year, Best Music Video, Best Rap Performance and Best Rap Song, winning the latter two.

== Background and release ==
On August 20, 2021, Kendrick Lamar revealed through a blog post on his website that he was in the process of producing his upcoming fifth studio album; his final project under Top Dawg Entertainment. He shared the album's name and release date through a PGLang-headed letter on April 18, 2022. Following the announcement, his website was updated with a new page entitled "The Heart", which contained 399 empty computer folders. News of the song's release was accidentally leaked by music streaming service Spotify, who teased the song through a description of Lamar's playlists before being changed.

On May 8, 2022, Lamar released "The Heart Part 5", his first solo release in over four years. The single's cover artwork depicts six photoshopped hands being held up, with each of them representing the perspectives Lamar raps about and depicts in the music video. For example, the hand on the far right is photoshopped from a photograph of O.J. Simpson wearing a glove during his 1995 murder trial. With the release of Mr. Morale & the Big Steppers five days later, the song was included as a digital bonus track.

"The Heart Part 5" serves as the fifth installment of Lamar's "The Heart" series, which were often released in promotion of his albums and feature long, intricate verses with conscious themes. "Part 1" was released in April 2010 prior to his Overly Dedicated (2010) mixtape, which also features "Part 2" as the opening track. "Part 3" was recorded three days before the release of Good Kid, M.A.A.D City (2012), and "Part 4" was released three weeks before Damn (2017).

== Music and lyrics ==
"The Heart Part 5"
A 27-second excerpt of the Lamar's first verse, in which he addresses Black Americans' moral compass, culture, and institutionalized discrimination.

"The Heart Part 5" is a conscious hip-hop song driven by soul and jazz influences. Lamar wrote the song alongside its producers Johnny Kosich, Matt Schaeffer, and Jake Kosich (known collectively as Beach Noise). Leon Ware and Arthur Ross received posthumous songwriting credits for the interpolation of the 1976 single "I Want You", as performed by Marvin Gaye. Lyrically, "The Heart Part 5" follows in the footsteps of its previous "The Heart" song series, and Lamar's third studio album To Pimp a Butterfly (2015), by offering social commentary on the climate of African-American culture and institutionalized discrimination. The song also delves into personal themes of empathy, death, and depression from different perspectives.

On his first verse, Lamar addresses Black Americans to evaluate their "collective moral compass" while refusing the idea of their deaths being considered "culture." He describes gang lifestyle as being absorbed by corporation and naive youth. Throughout the verse, Lamar utters "that's culture" as a sarcastic nod while rapping about Black violence. He then starts the song's second verse by repeating Jay-Z's lyric "I do this for my culture" from "Izzo (H.O.V.A.)" (2001) and emphasizes that there is "no glamor in the gang lifestyle", imaging someone's photo that ends up as their "R.I.P. shirt". Lamar reflects on his grief over the death of Nipsey Hussle, in which he showcases the "cycles of grief that have Black and Brown people in quicksand". At the end of the verse, he addresses listeners to think deeper about what they accept and embrace with the option to value each other's lives rather than tragedy.

== Music video and analysis ==
The music video uses deepfake technology, showing Lamar morphing into O. J. Simpson

The music video for "The Heart Part 5", directed by Lamar and Dave Free, was released alongside the song on May 8, 2022. The music video begins with a note stating "I am. All of us", which is signed with the name Oklama, having been used in a formal letter about leaving Top Dawg Entertainment. In the video, Lamar performs the song against a red wall, while using deepfake technology to transform himself into six modern Black American figures: in order, they are former football player and convicted felon O. J. Simpson, rapper Kanye West, actors Jussie Smollett and Will Smith, former basketball player Kobe Bryant, and rapper Nipsey Hussle. The deepfakes were made by South Park creators Trey Parker and Matt Stone's studio Deep Voodoo.

Each of the six deepfakes perform a verse from the song that reflects on their own perspectives. Simpson's verse, which addresses itself as being done "for the culture", mentions a "bulletproof rover" as a reference to his 1994 Ford Bronco chase. West's verse reflects on his battle with what was believed to be bipolar disorder and how often he has been taken advantage of. Smollett's verse reflects on the hypocrisy surrounding the media coverage of his 2019 hate crime hoax and subsequent arrest. Smith's verse reflects on the backlash he received following his slapping incident of Chris Rock at the 94th Academy Awards. After a moment of silence from Lamar, Bryant's verse reflects on being an influential figure through hard work and dedication. Hussle's verse, the longest in the video, takes the form of a soliloquy in the aftermath of his 2019 murder, saying that he is in heaven and forgives his killer but that his "soul's in question".

== Commercial performance ==
Upon its release, "The Heart Part 5" appeared on multiple charts. On the week of May 21, 2022, the single debuted and peaked at number fifteen on the US Billboard Hot 100 and number five on the US Hot R&B/Hip-Hop Songs chart, remaining in both charts for another week. It also peaked at number 25 on the Global 200 and number eighteen on the Canadian Hot 100. In the United Kingdom, the single peaked at number 24 on the Singles chart and number ten on the Hip Hop/R&B Singles chart. "The Heart Part 5" topped the South Africa Streaming chart and peaked at number six on the Sweden Heatseeker chart. Elsewhere, the single appeared on charts from Australia, Iceland, Lithuania, the Netherlands, New Zealand, Portugal, and Switzerland.

== Critical reception ==
"The Heart Part 5" was met with widespread critical acclaim, with Lamar's tribute to Hussle, a lifelong friend, receiving universal praise amongst critics and his peers. Hussle's longtime partner, actress Lauren London, described the music video as "powerful art." Dylan Green of Pitchfork crowned the song with its "Best New Track" honor. While he considered the deepfake effects to not be consistently convincing, they reinforced Lamar's lyrics by visualizing the complex relationship between Black identity and the pressures of celebrity. He also argued that the song's shifting perspectives showed what could be the most significant artistic transition of Lamar's career.

In a five-star review, Ben Beaumont-Thomas of The Guardian called the song as "a heart-stopping call for uplifted humanity". He praised Lamar's delivery based on a "manifesto of radical empathy." Beaumont-Thomas also commended Lamar's devotion to his community, writing that he drew upon Marvin Gaye's social conscience by "changing the title line from one of lust to one of hope", with the song's urgent disco-inspired rhythm reinforcing the sincerity of its message. Kyann-Sian Williams of NME wrote that, on what Lamar had said would be his final album with Top Dawg, he embraced his role as an elder statesman in hip-hop. Williams argued that Lamar acknowledged his influence and sought to become a "voice of reason and morality" rather than simply a celebrated rapper.

=== Accolades ===
"The Heart Part 5" won Best Rap Performance and Best Rap Song at the 65th Annual Grammy Awards in February 2023. It was also nominated for Record of the Year, Song of the Year, and Best Music Video. In 2022, it received two nominations from the MTV Video Music Awards for Video for Good and Best Visual Effects, a nomination from the BET Hip Hop Awards for Impact Track, and two nominations from the MTV Europe Music Awards for Best Video and Video for Good.

Year	Ceremony	Award	Result	Ref.
2022	MTV Video Music Awards	Video for Good	Nominated	
2022	MTV Video Music Awards	Best Visual Effects	Nominated	
2022	BET Hip Hop Awards	Impact Track	Nominated	
2022	MTV Europe Music Awards	Best Video	Nominated	
2022	MTV Europe Music Awards	Video for Good	Nominated	
2023	Grammy Awards	Record of the Year	Nominated	
2023	Grammy Awards	Song of the Year	Nominated	
2023	Grammy Awards	Best Rap Performance	Won	
2023	Grammy Awards	Best Rap Song	Won	
2023	Grammy Awards	Best Music Video	Nominated	

== Personnel ==
Credits were adapted from Tidal.

Musicians

- Kendrick Lamar – vocals, writing
- Matt Schaeffer (Beach Noise) – writing, production, bass, drum kit, guitar, mellotron, rhodes
- Jake Kosich (Beach Noise) – writing, production
- Johnny Kosich (Beach Noise) – writing, production, percussion
- Arthur Ross – writing
- Leon Ware – writing
- Kyle Miller – violin, cello
- Grandmaster Vic – strings
- Kaushlesh "Gary" Purohit – tabla
- Bekon – violin

Technical

- Michelle Mancini – mastering engineer
- Beach Noise – mixing engineer
- Rob Bisel – recording engineer
- Ray Charles Brown Jr. – recording engineer
- James Hunt – recording engineer
- Johnny Kosich – recording engineer
- Matt Schaeffer – recording engineer
- Johnathan Turner – recording engineer
- Marco Echeverria – recording, second engineer
- Sedrick Moore II – recording, second engineer
- Kaushlesh "Gary" Purohit – recording, second engineer
- Thomas Warren – recording, second engineer

== Charts ==
Chart (2022)	Peak position
Australia (ARIA)	31
Canada Hot 100 (Billboard)	18
Global 200 (Billboard)	25
Iceland (Tónlistinn)	27
Ireland (IRMA)	18
Lithuania (AGATA)	15
Netherlands (Single Top 100)	83
New Zealand (Recorded Music NZ)	15
Portugal (AFP)	45
South Africa Streaming (TOSAC)	1
Sweden Heatseeker (Sverigetopplistan)	6
Switzerland (Schweizer Hitparade)	50
UK Singles (Official Charts)	24
UK Hip Hop/R&B (Official Charts)	10
US Billboard Hot 100	15
US Hot R&B/Hip-Hop Songs (Billboard)	5
