= Comfort zone =

Psychological state

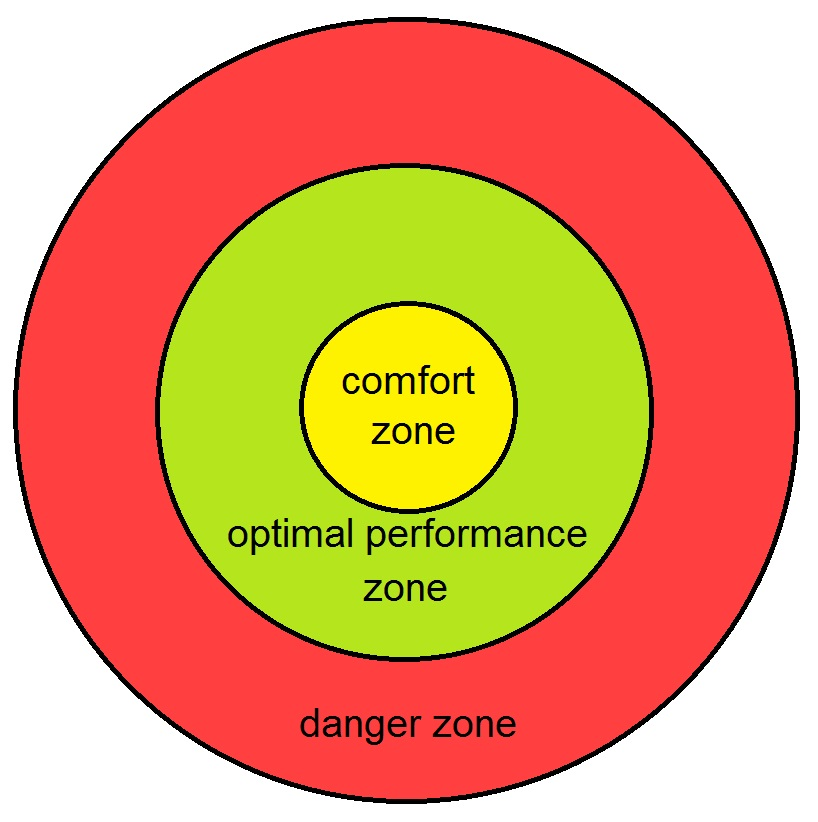
A Venn diagram of Comfort zone outside of which the optimal performance zone is present. Danger zone is marked in red.

A comfort zone is a familiar psychological state where people are at ease and (perceive they are) in control of their environment, experiencing low levels of anxiety and stress.

Judith Bardwick defines the term as "a behavioral state where a person operates in an anxiety-neutral position." Brené Brown describes it as "Where our uncertainty, scarcity and vulnerability are minimized—where we believe we'll have access to enough love, food, talent, time, admiration. Where we feel we have some control."

== Performance management ==
Alasdair White refers to the "optimal performance zone", in which performance can be enhanced by some amount of stress. Beyond the optimum performance zone, lies the "danger zone" in which performance declines rapidly under the influence of greater anxiety.

However, stress in general can have an adverse effect on decision making: fewer alternatives are tried out and more familiar strategies are used, even if they are not helpful anymore.

Optimal performance management requires maximizing time in the optimal performance zone. The main target should be expanding the comfort zone and optimal performance zone.

== See also ==
- Flow (psychology)
- Personal boundaries
- Yerkes–Dodson law
- Zone of proximal development
