= Good Company (company) =

US film production company

- Industry: Entertainment
- Founded: July 2011
- Founders: Jonathan Lia; Ryan Heiferman; Brian Welsh
- Headquarters: 81 Walker Street, 1st Floor, New York City, New York; 2825 Glendale Blvd, Los Angeles, California 90039
- Website: goodco.tv

Good Company is an independent US entertainment production company founded in 2012 by Jonathan Lia, Brian Welsh and Ryan Heiferman in New York City with a second office in Los Angeles. The company has produced content including commercials, music videos, films and experiential.

Good Company began 2012 with Kanye West and Jay-Z's "Niggas in Paris" music video, which was nominated for two VMA Awards, Best Video and Best Director. Later that year, it also produced West's Cruel Summer 7-screen film, which was premiered at the 2012 Cannes Film Festival, but has yet to be officially released.

Before Good Company was founded, its founders had received two D&AD awards, two Grammy nominations, one VMA winner, and nominations and honors from VMA, Much Music and National Board of Review. Lia co-directed the Saturday Night Live hit "I'm On A Boat" and was nominated for a Grammy for producing Depeche Mode's "Wrong" video. Welsh received a Latin Grammy nomination for producing Maná's "Lluvia al Corazón", which also won an MTV VMA. As independent producers, they produced commercials and music videos for Adidas, Toyota, Swatch, Beyoncé, Madonna, Kanye West, Timbaland, Björk, Blondie, and U2, among others.

Prior to creating Good Company, Lia and Welsh had already made their mark in the music video scene. In 2010, Lia had produced West's 34-minute musical short film, Runaway. The film functioned as a music video for Kanye West's fifth studio album, My Beautiful Dark Twisted Fantasy. It earned two nominations at the 2011 BET Awards, for best music video and best director. Welsh was a producer on Björks's 2008 "Wanderlust" music video, which was featured in her MET museum retrospective, as well as producing videos for artists such as Pharrell Williams, and Thom Yorke.
