= Family Ties (song) =

2021 single by Baby Keem and Kendrick Lamar

Single by Baby Keem and Kendrick Lamar

from the album The Melodic Blue
- Released: August 27, 2021
- Recorded: 2020–2021
- Genre: Hip-hop; trap
- Length: 4:12
- Label: PGLang; Columbia
- Songwriters: Hykeem Carter, Jr.; Kendrick Duckworth; Ronald LaTour, Jr.; Tobias Dekker; Roshwita Bacha; Dominik Patrzek; Jasper Harris; Colin Franken
- Producers: Baby Keem; Cardo; Outtatown; Roselilah; Deats; Jasper Harris; Frankie Bash

Baby Keem singles chronology
"Durag Activity" (2021)	"Family Ties" (2021)	"Issues" (2021)

Kendrick Lamar singles chronology
"The Mantra" (2018)	"Family Ties" (2021)	"N95" (2022)

Music video
- "Family Ties" on YouTube

Audio sample
- file; help

"Family Ties" (stylized in all lowercase) is a song by American rappers Baby Keem and Kendrick Lamar. The song was released on August 27, 2021, by Columbia Records and pgLang. The song serves as the fourth single from Keem's debut album, The Melodic Blue. The song also serves as Lamar’s first musical release under pgLang, a production company he co-founded in March 2020.

"Family Ties" marked Lamar's first single and new music since "Pray for Me" with Canadian singer The Weeknd, released in 2018. The song also marks the first official collaboration between Keem and Lamar, who are cousins. The single’s cover art depicts them in a family portrait, which pays homage to the album cover of Lamar's breakout 2012 album Good Kid, M.A.A.D City. The accompanying music video features a cameo from singer Normani and won the 2022 BET Award for Video of the Year. It spent 19 weeks on the Billboard Hot 100, peaking at number 18.

== Accolades ==
The song received two nominations at the 2022 Grammy Awards for Best Rap Song and Best Rap Performance, winning the latter award. It also received two nominations for Song of the Year and Video of the Year at the 2022 XXL Awards.

== Music video ==
The accompanying music video was directed by Dave Free, and features a cameo from singer Normani, alongside Baby Keem, and Lamar who is billed mid-video as Oklama.

In the first scene, the music video begins with a moshpit of black men, who are wearing black bombers and sunglasses surrounding Keem and Lamar, with the two artists wearing orange attire. Black ballerinas are also featured. In the second scene, Lamar raps about still being relevant in hip-hop despite taking a hiatus. Near the end of the music video, Normani appears in a stretch limo SUV alongside the two rappers, before the rappers make their last proclamations. Throughout the video, clips of different sizes and themes are placed on top of the video, overlapping the ones below them. The video is divided into two "scenes", with scene 1 representing Keem's section, and scene 2 representing Lamar's section.

== Critical reception ==
In a review for the track, Pitchfork wrote that "Kendrick's oddball raps and nonsensical flow switches express a newfound creative freedom. His future is his own."

== Awards and nominations ==
Awards	Year	Category	Result	Ref.
BET Awards	2022	Video of the Year	Won	
Grammy Awards	2022	Best Rap Song	Nominated	
Grammy Awards	2022	Best Rap Performance	Won	

== Charts ==
=== Weekly charts ===
Weekly chart performance for "Family Ties"
Chart (2021)	Peak position
Australia (ARIA)	44
Canada Hot 100 (Billboard)	19
Global 200 (Billboard)	25
Ireland (IRMA)	32
Lithuania (AGATA)	43
New Zealand (Recorded Music NZ)	29
Portugal (AFP)	65
South Africa (TOSAC)	18
Sweden Heatseeker (Sverigetopplistan)	12
UK Singles (Official Charts)	52
UK Hip Hop/R&B (Official Charts)	23
US Billboard Hot 100	18
US Hot R&B/Hip-Hop Songs (Billboard)	8
US Rhythmic Airplay (Billboard)	19

=== Year-end charts ===
2021 year-end chart performance for "Family Ties"
Chart (2021)	Position
US Hot R&B/Hip-Hop Songs (Billboard)	66

2022 year-end chart performance for "Family Ties"
Chart (2022)	Position
US Hot R&B/Hip-Hop Songs (Billboard)	79

== Certifications ==
Certifications for "Family Ties"
Region	Certification	Certified units/sales
Canada (Music Canada)	2× Platinum	160,000^{‡}
Denmark (IFPI Danmark)	Gold	45,000^{‡}
France (SNEP)	Gold	100,000^{‡}
New Zealand (RMNZ)	2× Platinum	60,000^{‡}
Poland (ZPAV)	Gold	25,000^{‡}
Portugal (AFP)	Platinum	10,000^{‡}
United Kingdom (BPI)	Platinum	600,000^{‡}
United States (RIAA)	5× Platinum	5,000,000^{‡}
^{‡} Sales+streaming figures based on certification alone.
