= Baby Keem discography =

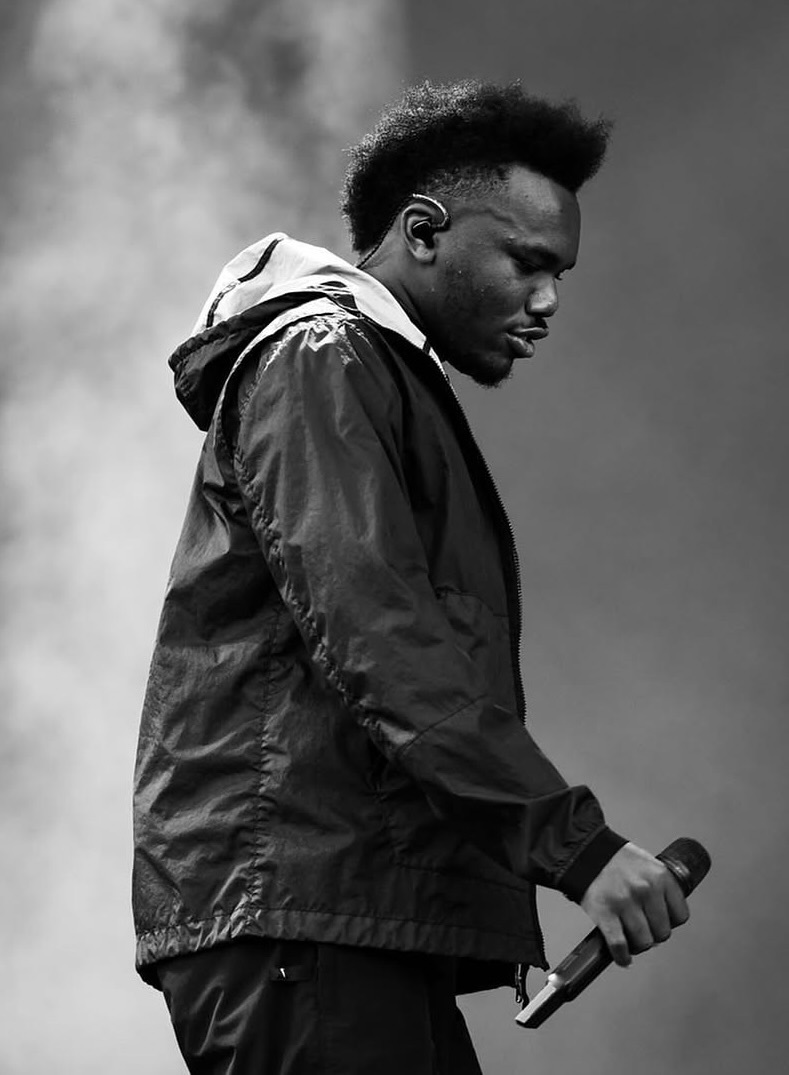
- Baby Keem performing in 2022
- Studio albums: 2
- EPs: 4
- Singles: 10
- Music videos: 16
- Mixtapes: 2

American rapper and record producer Baby Keem has released two studio albums, two mixtapes, four extended plays (EP), and ten singles. According to the Recording Industry Association of America (RIAA), he has sold one million certified albums and five million certified singles in the United States.

Following the release of several extended plays and mixtapes, Keem gained mainstream attention through his second mixtape, Die for My Bitch (2019), which includes the sleeper hit lead single, "Orange Soda". The song became his first to chart on the US Billboard Hot 100, while the mixtape marked his first appearance on the Billboard 200. Keem continues to rise in prominence with his debut studio album, The Melodic Blue, released through PGLang and Columbia Records on September 10, 2021. The album was positively received by music critics and marked his first top-10 album on the Billboard 200. It spawned the commercially successful singles "Durag Activity" (with Travis Scott) and "Family Ties" (with Kendrick Lamar); the latter marked Keem's first top-20 single on the Billboard Hot 100. His second studio album, Casino, was released on February 20, 2026.

== Albums ==
=== Studio albums ===
List of studio albums, with selected details
Title	Album details	Peak chart positions										Certifications
Title	Album details	US	AUS	CAN	FRA	GER	IRE	NOR	NZ	SWE	UK	Certifications
The Melodic Blue	Released: September 10, 2021; Label: PGLang, Columbia; Formats: LP, digital download, streaming	5	21	5	93	67	23	9	12	59	49	RIAA: Platinum; MC: Gold; BPI: Silver
Casino	Released: February 20, 2026; Label: PGLang, Columbia; Formats: CD, LP, digital download, streaming	4	13	8	109	28	24	25	6	27	29	

== Extended plays ==
List of extended plays, with selected details
Title	Details
Oct (as Hykeem Carter)	Released: November 7, 2017; Label: Self-released; Formats: Digital download, streaming
Midnight (as Hykeem Carter)	Released: January 16, 2018; Label: Self-released; Formats: Digital download, streaming
No Name (as Hykeem Carter)	Released: May 18, 2018; Label: Self-released; Formats: Digital download, streaming
Hearts & Darts	Released: July 12, 2018; Label: Self-released; Formats: Digital download, streaming

== Mixtapes ==
List of mixtapes, with selected details
Title	Details	Peak chart positions
Title	Details	US
The Sound of Bad Habit	Released: October 29, 2018; Label: The Orchard, Sony; Formats: Digital download, streaming	—
Die for My Bitch	Released: July 19, 2019; Label: The Orchard, Sony; Formats: Digital download, streaming	162

== Singles ==
Title	Year	Peak chart positions						Certifications	Album
Title	Year	US	AUS	CAN	IRE	NZ	UK	Certifications	Album
"Invented It"	2019	—	—	—	—	—	—		Die for My Bitch
"France Freestyle"	2019	—	—	—	—	—	—		Die for My Bitch
"Orange Soda"	2019	98	—	100	—	—	—	RIAA: 4× Platinum; BPI: Gold; RMNZ: Platinum	Die for My Bitch
"Hooligan"	2020	—	—	—	—	—	—		The Melodic Blue
"Sons & Critics Freestyle"	2020	—	—	—	—	—	—		Non-album single
"No Sense"	2021	—	—	—	—	—	—		The Melodic Blue
"Durag Activity" (with Travis Scott)	2021	85	—	53	74	—	96	RIAA: Gold; MC: Gold	The Melodic Blue
"Family Ties" (with Kendrick Lamar)	2021	18	44	19	32	29	52	RIAA: 4× Platinum; BPI: Gold; MC: 2× Platinum; RMNZ: 2× Platinum	The Melodic Blue
"Issues"	2021	— (Note: "Issues" did not enter the US Billboard Hot 100, but peaked at number 22 on the Bubbling Under Hot 100 chart.)	—	—	—	— (Note: "Issues" did not enter the NZ Top 40 Singles Chart, but peaked at number 30 on the NZ Hot Singles Chart.)	—		The Melodic Blue
"The Hillbillies" (with Kendrick Lamar)	2023	93	—	80	—	— (Note: "The Hillbillies" did not enter the NZ Top 40 Singles Chart, but peaked at number 14 on the NZ Hot Singles Chart.)	—		Non-album single
"Leavemealone" (with Fred Again)	2023	—	13	—	21	4	11	ARIA: Platinum; BPI: Platinum; RMNZ: 2× Platinum	USB
"Good Flirts" (featuring Kendrick Lamar and Momo Boyd)	2026	34	—	46	—	—	—		Casino
"—" denotes a recording that did not chart or was not released in that territory.

== Other charted and certified songs ==
List of songs, with selected chart positions, showing year released and album name
Title	Year	Peak chart positions									Certifications	Album
Title	Year	US	US R&B	US Rap	AUS	CAN	IRE	NZ Hot	ZAF Stream.	WW	Certifications	Album
"Honest"	2019	—	—	—	—	—	81	—	*	—	RIAA: 2× Platinum; RMNZ: Platinum	Die for My Bitch
"Praise God" (Kanye West featuring Travis Scott and Baby Keem)	2021	20	10	9	13	17	—	—	4	—	RIAA: Platinum; BPI: Silver; RMNZ: Platinum	Donda
"Trademark USA"	2021	— (Note: "Trademark USA" did not enter the US Billboard Hot 100, but peaked at number eight on the Bubbling Under Hot 100 chart.)	—	—	—	—	—	25	—	—	RIAA: Platinum; MC: Gold; RMNZ: Gold	The Melodic Blue
"Range Brothers" (with Kendrick Lamar)	2021	53	23	20	—	61	93	11	—	—	RIAA: Gold	The Melodic Blue
"Cocoa" (featuring Don Toliver)	2021	—	—	—	—	—	—	29	—	—		The Melodic Blue
"Lost Souls" (featuring Brent Faiyaz)	2021	—	—	—	—	—	—	24	—	—	RIAA: Platinum; RMNZ: Gold	The Melodic Blue
"16"	2021	—	—	—	—	—	—	—	—	—	RIAA: Gold; RMNZ: Gold	The Melodic Blue
"Bank Account" (featuring Lil Uzi Vert)	2022	— (Note: "Bank Account" did not enter the Billboard Hot 100, but peaked at number 15 on the Bubbling Under Hot 100 chart.)	46	—	—	—	—	—	—			The Melodic Blue
"No Security"	2026	76	22	16	—	—	—	—	64	—		Casino
"Casino"	2026	37	10	5	—	48	—	4	36	86		Casino
"Birds & the Bees"	2026	50	14	9	—	62	—	7	48	175		Casino
"House Money"	2026	47	12	7	—	53	—	6	31	128		Casino
"I Am Not a Lyricist"	2026	89	27	21	—	—	—	—	68	—		Casino
"Sex Appeal" (featuring Too Short)	2026	69	18	13	—	88	—	—	96	—		Casino
"Highway 95 Pt. 2"	2026	88	26	20	—	—	—	—	99	—		Casino
"Circus Circus Freestyle"	2026	66	17	12	—	100	—	—	74	—		Casino
"Dramatic Girl" (featuring Che Ecru)	2026	77	—	—	—	95	—	—	—	—		Casino
"No Blame"	2026	— (Note: "No Blame" did not enter the Billboard Hot 100, but peaked at number 20 on the Bubbling Under Hot 100 chart.)	49	—	—	—	—	—	—	—		Casino
"—" denotes a recording that did not chart or was not released in that territory. "*" denotes that the chart did not exist at that time.

== Guest appearances ==
List of non-single guest appearances, with other performing artists, showing year released and album name
Title	Year	Artist(s)	Album
"Praise God"	2021	Kanye West, Travis Scott	Donda
"Outerspace"	2021	Don Toliver	Life of a Don
"We Did It Kid"	2022	Kanye West, Migos	Donda 2
"Savior"	2022	Kendrick Lamar, Sam Dew	Mr. Morale & the Big Steppers

== Music videos ==
Title	Year	Director(s)	Ref.
As lead artist
"Baby Keem"	2018	—N/a	
"Miss Charlotte"	2018	—N/a	
"Gang Activities"	2019	Shia LaBeouf	
"Invented It"	2019	Neal Farmer	
"Honest"	2019	James R. Weneta	
"Orange Soda"	2019	Dave Free	
"Moshpit"	2019	Jack Begert	
"Hooligan"	2020	Jake Schreier	
"No Sense"	2021	Savannah Setten	
"Durag Activity" (with Travis Scott)	2021	Eliel Ford	
"Family Ties" (with Kendrick Lamar)	2021	Dave Free	
"Issues"	2021	Jake Schreier	
"First Order of Business"	2021	Dave Free	
"The Hillbillies" (with Kendrick Lamar)	2023	Neal Farmer	
"Birds & the Bees"	2026	Jack Begert	
"Good Flirts" (featuring Kendrick Lamar and Momo Boyd)	2026	Renell Medrano	
Guest appearance
"N95" (Kendrick Lamar)	2022	Dave Free and Kendrick Lamar	

== Production credits ==
=== 2018 ===
Kendrick Lamar and various artists — Black Panther: The Album

- 10. "Redemption Interlude" (performed by Zacari) (produced with Kendrick Lamar)

Jay Rock — Redemption

- 03. "Knock It Off"
- 05. "Rotation 112th"

=== 2019 ===
Schoolboy Q — Crash Talk

- 04. "Numb Numb Juice" (produced with DJ Fu and Nez & Rio)
- 06. "Lies" (featuring Ty Dolla $ign and YG) (produced with Sounwave)

Beyoncé and various artists — The Lion King: The Gift

- 10. "NILE" (performed by Beyoncé and Kendrick Lamar) (produced with Beyoncé, Sounwave, Johnny Kosich and Keanu Beats)

=== 2021 ===
Baby Keem — The Melodic Blue

- 01. "Trademark USA" (produced with Frank Dukes, Rogét Chahayed, Teo Halm and Scott Bridgeway)
- 02. "Pink Panties" (produced with Che Ecru)
- 03. "Scapegoats" (produced with DJ Dahi, FnZ and Johnny Kosich)
- 04. "Range Brothers" (with Kendrick Lamar) (produced with 30 Roc, Jahaan Sweet, Scott Bridgeway, Dez Wright, Ricky Polo and Sloane)
- 05. "Issues" (produced with Jahaan Sweet)
- 06. "Gorgeous" (produced with Jahaan Sweet, Cardo, Johnny Juliano and Yung Exclusive)
- 07. "South Africa" (produced with Bekon)
- 08. "Lost Souls" (produced with Jahaan Sweet, Scott Bridgeway, Jake the Snake, Che Ecru and Beach Noise)
- 09. "Cocoa" (with Don Toliver) (produced with Jahaan Sweet and Scott Bridgeway)
- 10. "Family Ties" (with Kendrick Lamar) (produced with Cardo, Outtatown, Roselilah, Deats, Jasper Harris and Frankie Bash)
- 11. "Scars" (produced with Jahaan Sweet, Scott Bridgeway, Jake the Snake and Beach Noise)
- 13. "Booman" (produced with Jake the Snake and Beach Noise)
- 14. "First Order of Business" (produced with Jahaan Sweet)
- 15. "Vent" (produced with DJ Dahi, Sounwave, J. Lbs, Scott Bridgeway and Beach Noise)

Baby Keem — The Melodic Blue (B-side)

- 01. "Lost Souls" (with Brent Faiyaz) (produced with Jahaan Sweet, Scott Bridgeway, Jake the Snake, Che Ecru and Beach Noise)
- 03. "No Sense" (produced with Jahaan Sweet)

Don Toliver – Life of a Don

- 12. "Outerspace" (featuring Baby Keem) (produced with Dez Wright, London Cyr, Mike Dean, Jahaan Sweet and Moonraccoon)

=== 2022 ===
Kendrick Lamar — Mr. Morale & the Big Steppers

- 02. "N95" (additional producer; produced with Boi-1da, Sounwave and Jahaan Sweet)
- 04. "Die Hard" (with Blxst and Amanda Reifer) (produced with Sounwave, DJ Dahi and J. Lbs)

Offset — Non-album single

- "54321" (produced with Mike Dean, Jahaan Sweet and Scott Bridgeway)

Baby Keem — The Melodic Blue (deluxe)

- 01. "A Life of Pain" (produced with Scott Bridgeway and Jahaan Sweet)
- 03. "Patience Interlude" (produced with Dez Wright and Beach Noise)
- 05. "Fine China" (produced with Jahaan Sweet and Dez Wright)
- 06. "Highway 95" (produced with Scott Bridgeway, Tae Beast, Rascal, John Bloom and Ms. Lauryn Hill)
- 07. "Bank Account" (with Lil Uzi Vert) (produced with Scott Bridgeway, Soldado and Ojivolta)
