= List of awards and nominations received by Kendrick Lamar =

Kendrick Lamar awards and nominations
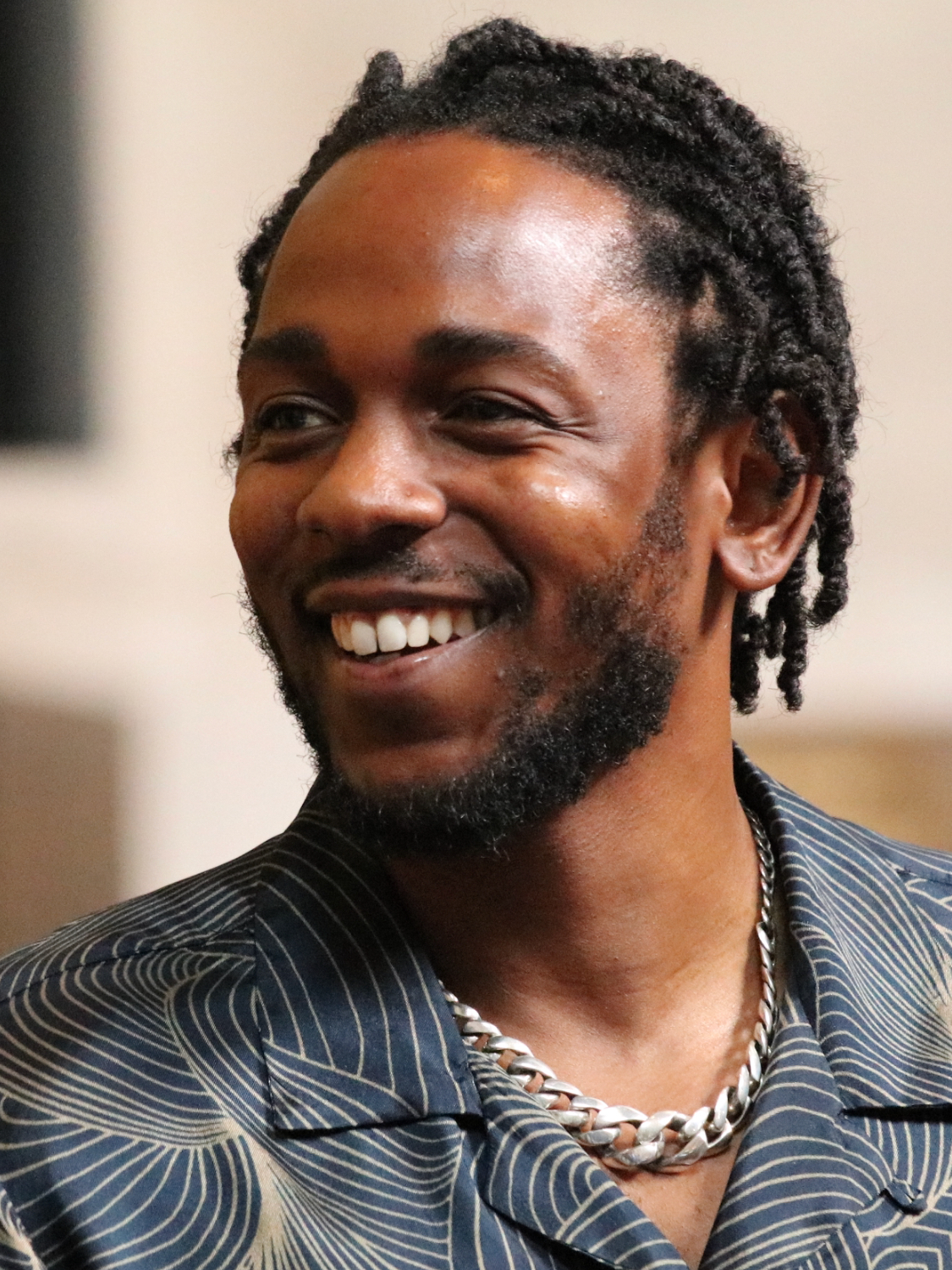
- Lamar at the 2018 Pulitzer Prize ceremony
Awards and nominations
Award	Wins	Nominations
Academy Awards	0	1
American Music Awards	5	17
BET Awards	16	37
BET Hip Hop Awards	37	67
Billboard Music Awards	7	26
Brit Awards	1	2
Grammy Awards	27	57
Golden Globe Awards	0	1
Juno Awards	1	2
MOBO Awards	1	4
MTV Europe Music Awards	2	18
MTV Video Music Awards	12	41
MTV Video Music Awards Japan	1	2
NAACP Image Awards	9	25
Primetime Emmy Awards	2	3
People's Choice Awards	0	5
Pulitzer Prize	1	1
Soul Train Music Awards	2	12
Teen Choice Awards	2	9

Totals (Note: Certain award groups do not simply award one winner. They acknowledge several different recipients, have runners-up, and have third place. Since this is a specific recognition and is different from losing an award, runner-up mentions are considered wins in this award tally. For simplification and to avoid errors, each award in this list has been presumed to have had a prior nomination.)
- Wins: 216
- Nominations: 496

Throughout his career, American rapper and songwriter Kendrick Lamar has received several awards, nominations, and cultural honors. He signed to Top Dawg Entertainment (TDE) in 2005 and released his debut studio album, Section.80, in 2011. At the 2011 BET Hip Hop Awards, the album received a nomination for Best Mixtape. Lamar's second album, Good Kid, M.A.A.D City (2012), earned him seven nominations at the 56th Annual Grammy Awards, including for Album of the Year, Best New Artist and Best Rap Album. His third studio album, To Pimp a Butterfly (2015), was preceded by the Grammy Award for Best Rap Song and Best Rap Performance-winning single "I". For his work on the album and additional collaborations from that year, Lamar received the most Grammy Award nominations by a rapper in a single night, with 11.

At the 58th Annual Grammy Awards, To Pimp a Butterfly was awarded Best Rap Album, while tracks from the album won Best Rap Song, Best Rap Performance, and Best Rap/Sung Collaboration. Lamar was declared a generational icon by the California State Senate for his music and philanthropic contributions, and was given the key to his hometown of Compton. His fourth studio album, Damn (2017), went on to win five awards at the 60th Annual Grammy Awards, including Best Rap Album. The album became the first musical composition outside of the classical and jazz genres to be awarded the Pulitzer Prize for Music. For his work on the soundtrack album for the superhero film Black Panther (2018), which he curated and executive produced, Lamar won the Grammy Award for Best Rap Performance and was nominated for the Golden Globe and Academy Award for Best Original Song. He won another Grammy Award for Best Rap Performance in 2022 for the single "Family Ties" with Baby Keem, and won three Grammy Awards in 2023 for his fifth studio album Mr. Morale & the Big Steppers (2022). At the 67th Annual Grammy Awards, Lamar's song "Not Like Us" (2024) went on to win five awards. In 2026 68th Grammy Awards his GNX sixth studio won for Best Rap Album, while the single "Luther" winning Record of the Year and Best Melodic Rap Performance and the song "TV Off" won Best Rap Song. Lamar has become the most awarded rapper in Grammy history with 27 career wins, surpassing Jay-Z record.

Lamar is the most awarded artist in BET Hip Hop Awards history, with 37 wins. He has won eleven MTV Video Music Awards, including Video of the Year for "Bad Blood" with Taylor Swift and "Humble". With the latter video, he became the first artist to win Video of the Year for a music video he co-directed. As a headliner of the Pepsi Super Bowl LVI Halftime Show, Lamar won the Primetime Emmy Award for Outstanding Variety Special (Live).

== Awards and nominations ==
Award	Year	Recipient(s)	Category	Result	Ref.
Academy Awards	2019	"All the Stars" (with SZA)	Best Original Song	Nominated	
African-American Film Critics Association	2018	"All the Stars" (with SZA)	Best Song	Won	
African-American Film Critics Association	2023	We Cry Together	Best Live Action Short	Won	
AICE Awards	2016	Kendrick Lamar - Compton: Witness Greatness	Montage	Nominated	
AICE Awards	2016	Kendrick Lamar - Compton: Witness Greatness	Digital Content (Over :90)	Nominated	
AICE Awards	2018	"Humble"	Music Video	Won	
AICE Awards	2018	"Humble"	Color Grading – Music Video	Nominated	
AICE Awards	2018	"Element"	Color Grading – Music Video	Nominated	
American Music Awards	2013	Good Kid, M.A.A.D City	Favorite Rap/Hip Hop Album	Nominated	
American Music Awards	2015	"Bad Blood" (Taylor Swift featuring Kendrick Lamar)	Collaboration of the Year	Nominated	
American Music Awards	2017	"Don't Wanna Know" (Maroon 5 featuring Kendrick Lamar)	Collaboration of the Year	Nominated	
American Music Awards	2017	Kendrick Lamar	Artist of the Year	Nominated	
American Music Awards	2017	Kendrick Lamar	Favorite Rap/Hip Hop Artist	Nominated	
American Music Awards	2017	"Humble"	Favorite Rap/Hip Hop Song	Nominated	
American Music Awards	2017	Damn	Favorite Rap/Hip Hop Album	Won	
American Music Awards	2018	Black Panther: The Album	Favorite Rap/Hip Hop Album	Won	
American Music Awards	2022	Kendrick Lamar	Favorite Male Hip-Hop Artist	Won	
American Music Awards	2022	Mr. Morale & the Big Steppers	Favorite Hip-Hop Album	Won	
American Music Awards	2025	Kendrick Lamar	Artist of the Year	Nominated	
American Music Awards	2025	Kendrick Lamar	Favorite Male Hip-Hop Artist	Nominated	
American Music Awards	2025	GNX	Album of the Year	Nominated	
American Music Awards	2025	GNX	Favorite Hip-Hop Album	Nominated	
American Music Awards	2025	"Not Like Us"	Song of the Year	Nominated	
American Music Awards	2025	"Not Like Us"	Favorite Music Video	Nominated	
American Music Awards	2025	"Not Like Us"	Favorite Hip-Hop Song	Won	
American Music Awards	2025	"Like That" (with Future and Metro Boomin)	Favorite Hip-Hop Song	Nominated	
American Music Awards	2025	"Luther" (with SZA)	Favorite Hip-Hop Song	Nominated	
American Music Awards	2025	"Luther" (with SZA)	Collaboration of the Year	Nominated	
ARIA Music Awards	2017	Kendrick Lamar	Best International Artist	Nominated	
ARIA Music Awards	2017	"The Greatest" (Sia featuring Kendrick Lamar)	Song of the Year	Nominated	
ASCAP Rhythm & Soul Music Awards	2013	Kendrick Lamar	Vanguard Award	Won	
ASCAP Rhythm & Soul Music Awards	2014	"Bitch, Don't Kill My Vibe"	Award Winning R&B/Hip-Hop Songs	Won	
ASCAP Rhythm & Soul Music Awards	2014	"Fuckin' Problems" (ASAP Rocky featuring Drake, 2 Chainz, and Kendrick Lamar)	Award Winning R&B/Hip-Hop Songs	Won	
ASCAP Rhythm & Soul Music Awards	2014	"Give It 2 U" (Robin Thicke featuring 2 Chainz and Kendrick Lamar)	Award Winning R&B/Hip-Hop Songs	Won	
ASCAP Rhythm & Soul Music Awards	2014	"Poetic Justice" (featuring Drake)	Award Winning R&B/Hip-Hop Songs	Won	
ASCAP Rhythm & Soul Music Awards	2014	"Swimming Pools (Drank)"	Award Winning R&B/Hip-Hop Songs	Won	
ASCAP Rhythm & Soul Music Awards	2014	"Fuckin' Problems" (ASAP Rocky featuring Drake, 2 Chainz, and Kendrick Lamar)	Award Winning Rap Songs	Won	
ASCAP Rhythm & Soul Music Awards	2014	"Swimming Pools (Drank)"	Award Winning Rap Songs	Won	
ASCAP Rhythm & Soul Music Awards	2016	"All Day" (Kanye West featuring Theophilus London, Allan Kingdom, and Paul McCartney; credited as songwriter)	Award Winning R&B/Hip-Hop and Rap Songs	Won	
ASCAP Rhythm & Soul Music Awards	2018	"Goosebumps" (Travis Scott featuring Kendrick Lamar)	Award-Winning R&B/Hip-Hop Songs	Won	
ASCAP Rhythm & Soul Music Awards	2018	"Humble"	Award-Winning R&B/Hip-Hop Songs	Won	
ASCAP Rhythm & Soul Music Awards	2018	"Loyalty" (featuring Rihanna)	Award-Winning R&B/Hip-Hop Songs	Won	
ASCAP Rhythm & Soul Music Awards	2018	"Loyalty" (featuring Rihanna)	Award-Winning Rap Songs	Won	
ASCAP Rhythm & Soul Music Awards	2018	"Goosebumps" (Travis Scott featuring Kendrick Lamar)	Award-Winning Rap Songs	Won	
ASCAP Rhythm & Soul Music Awards	2018	"Humble"	Top Rap Song	Won	
ASCAP Pop Music Awards	2016	"Bad Blood" (Taylor Swift featuring Kendrick Lamar)	Most Performed Songs	Won	
ASCAP Pop Music Awards	2018	"Don't Wanna Know" (Maroon 5 featuring Kendrick Lamar)	Most Performed Songs	Won	
ASCAP Pop Music Awards	2018	"The Greatest" (Sia featuring Kendrick Lamar)	Most Performed Songs	Won	
ASCAP Pop Music Awards	2018	"Humble"	Most Performed Songs	Won	
BBC Music Awards	2017	Kendrick Lamar	Artist of the Year	Nominated	
BET Awards	2013	Kendrick Lamar	Best New Artist	Won	
BET Awards	2013	Kendrick Lamar	Best Male Hip Hop Artist	Won	
BET Awards	2013	"Fuckin' Problems" (ASAP Rocky featuring Drake, 2 Chainz, and Kendrick Lamar)	Best Collaboration	Won	
BET Awards	2013	"Fuckin' Problems" (ASAP Rocky featuring Drake, 2 Chainz, and Kendrick Lamar)	Coca-Cola Viewer's Choice Award	Nominated	
BET Awards	2013	"Fuckin' Problems" (ASAP Rocky featuring Drake, 2 Chainz, and Kendrick Lamar)	Video of the Year	Nominated	
BET Awards	2013	"Poetic Justice" (featuring Drake)	Video of the Year	Nominated	
BET Awards	2013	"Poetic Justice" (featuring Drake)	Best Collaboration	Nominated	
BET Awards	2013	"Swimming Pools (Drank)"	Coca-Cola Viewer's Choice Award	Nominated	
BET Awards	2014	Kendrick Lamar	Best Male Hip Hop Artist	Nominated	
BET Awards	2015	Kendrick Lamar	Best Male Hip Hop Artist	Won	
BET Awards	2015	"I"	Coca-Cola Viewer's Choice Award	Nominated	
BET Awards	2016	"Alright"	Video of the Year	Nominated	
BET Awards	2016	Kendrick Lamar	Best Male Hip Hop Artist	Nominated	
BET Awards	2017	"Freedom" (Beyoncé featuring Kendrick Lamar)	Best Collaboration	Nominated	
BET Awards	2017	Kendrick Lamar	Best Male Hip Hop Artist	Won	
BET Awards	2018	Kendrick Lamar	Best Male Hip Hop Artist	Won	
BET Awards	2018	Black Panther: The Album	Album of the Year	Nominated	
BET Awards	2018	Damn	Album of the Year	Won	
BET Awards	2018	"Humble"	Video of the Year	Nominated	
BET Awards	2018	"Humble"	Coca-Cola Viewer's Choice Award	Nominated	
BET Awards	2018	"Loyalty" (featuring Rihanna)	Best Collaboration	Nominated	
BET Awards	2022	"Family Ties" (with Baby Keem)	Video of the Year	Won	
BET Awards	2022	"Family Ties" (with Baby Keem)	Best Collaboration	Nominated	
BET Awards	2022	Kendrick Lamar	Best Male Hip Hop Artist	Won	
BET Awards	2023	Mr. Morale & the Big Steppers	Album of the Year	Nominated	
BET Awards	2023	Kendrick Lamar	Best Male Hip Hop Artist	Won	
BET Awards	2023	Kendrick Lamar and Dave Free	Video Director of the Year	Nominated	
BET Awards	2024	Kendrick Lamar	Best Male Hip Hop Artist	Won	
BET Awards	2024	"America Has a Problem (Remix)" (Beyoncé featuring Kendrick Lamar)	Best Collaboration	Nominated	
BET Awards	2025	GNX	Album of the Year	Won	
BET Awards	2025	"Not Like Us"	Video of the Year	Won	
BET Awards	2025	"Not Like Us"	Viewer's Choice	Nominated	
BET Awards	2025	"Like That" (with Future and Metro Boomin)	Viewer's Choice	Nominated	
BET Awards	2025	"Luther" (with SZA)	Viewer's Choice	Nominated	
BET Awards	2025	"Luther" (with SZA)	Best Collaboration	Won	
BET Awards	2025	"30 for 30" (with SZA)	Best Collaboration	Nominated	
BET Awards	2025	"Like That" (with Future and Metro Boomin)	Best Collaboration	Nominated	
BET Awards	2025	Kendrick Lamar	Best Male Hip Hop Artist	Won	
BET Awards	2025	Kendrick Lamar and Dave Free	Video Director of the Year	Won	
BET Awards	2026	Kendrick Lamar	Best Male Hip Hop Artist	Won	
BET Awards	2026	"Luther" (with SZA)	Video of the Year	Nominated	
BET Awards	2026	"Chains & Whips" (with Clipse)	Viewer's Choice	Nominated	
BET Awards	2026	"Chains & Whips" (with Clipse)	Best Collaboration	Won	
BET Awards	2026	"Good Flirts" (with Baby Keem & Momo Boyd)	Best Collaboration	Nominated	
BET Hip Hop Awards	2011	Section.80	Best Mixtape	Nominated	
BET Hip Hop Awards	2012	Kendrick Lamar	Lyricist of the Year	Won	
BET Hip Hop Awards	2013	Kendrick Lamar	Lyricist of the Year	Won	
BET Hip Hop Awards	2013	Kendrick Lamar	Made-You-Look Award (Best Hip Hop Style)	Nominated	
BET Hip Hop Awards	2013	Kendrick Lamar	Best Live Performer	Nominated	
BET Hip Hop Awards	2013	Kendrick Lamar	Hustler of the Year	Nominated	
BET Hip Hop Awards	2013	Kendrick Lamar	MVP of the Year	Won	
BET Hip Hop Awards	2013	Good Kid, M.A.A.D City	Hip Hop Album of the Year	Won	
BET Hip Hop Awards	2013	"Poetic Justice" (featuring Drake)	Reese's Perfect Combo Award (Best Collaboration, Duo or Group)	Nominated	
BET Hip Hop Awards	2013	"Fuckin' Problems" (ASAP Rocky featuring Drake, 2 Chainz, and Kendrick Lamar)	Reese's Perfect Combo Award (Best Collaboration, Duo or Group)	Won	
BET Hip Hop Awards	2013	"Fuckin' Problems" (ASAP Rocky featuring Drake, 2 Chainz, and Kendrick Lamar)	Best Hip Hop Video	Nominated	
BET Hip Hop Awards	2013	"Fuckin' Problems" (ASAP Rocky featuring Drake, 2 Chainz, and Kendrick Lamar)	Best Club Banger	Nominated	
BET Hip Hop Awards	2013	"Fuckin' Problems" (ASAP Rocky featuring Drake, 2 Chainz, and Kendrick Lamar)	Sweet 16: Best Featured Verse	Won	
BET Hip Hop Awards	2013	"Fuckin' Problems" (ASAP Rocky featuring Drake, 2 Chainz, and Kendrick Lamar)	People's Champ Award	Nominated	
BET Hip Hop Awards	2013	"Bitch, Don't Kill My Vibe"	People's Champ Award	Nominated	
BET Hip Hop Awards	2013	"Bitch, Don't Kill My Vibe"	Best Hip Hop Video	Nominated	
BET Hip Hop Awards	2014	"Control" (Big Sean featuring Kendrick Lamar and Jay Electronica)	Sweet 16: Best Featured Verse	Won	
BET Hip Hop Awards	2014	Kendrick Lamar	Best Live Performer	Nominated	
BET Hip Hop Awards	2014	Kendrick Lamar	Lyricist of the Year	Won	
BET Hip Hop Awards	2015	Kendrick Lamar	Lyricist of the Year	Won	
BET Hip Hop Awards	2015	Kendrick Lamar	Best Live Performer	Nominated	
BET Hip Hop Awards	2015	Kendrick Lamar	MVP of the Year	Nominated	
BET Hip Hop Awards	2015	To Pimp a Butterfly	Hip Hop Album of the Year	Nominated	
BET Hip Hop Awards	2015	"Alright"	Best Hip Hop Video	Won	
BET Hip Hop Awards	2015	"Alright"	Impact Track	Won	
BET Hip Hop Awards	2015	"I"	People's Champ Award	Nominated	
BET Hip Hop Awards	2015	"Classic Man" (Jidenna featuring Kendrick Lamar)	Sweet 16: Best Featured Verse	Nominated	
BET Hip Hop Awards	2016	"Freedom" (Beyoncé featuring Kendrick Lamar)	Sweet 16: Best Featured Verse	Won	
BET Hip Hop Awards	2016	Kendrick Lamar	Best Live Performer	Won	
BET Hip Hop Awards	2016	Kendrick Lamar	Lyricist of the Year	Won	
BET Hip Hop Awards	2016	Kendrick Lamar	MVP of the Year	Nominated	
BET Hip Hop Awards	2017	Kendrick Lamar	Hot Ticket Performer	Won	
BET Hip Hop Awards	2017	Kendrick Lamar	Lyricist of the Year	Won	
BET Hip Hop Awards	2017	Kendrick Lamar	MVP of the Year	Nominated	
BET Hip Hop Awards	2017	Kendrick Lamar	Hustler of the Year	Nominated	
BET Hip Hop Awards	2017	"Humble"	Best Hip Hop Video	Won	
BET Hip Hop Awards	2017	"Humble"	Single of the Year	Nominated	
BET Hip Hop Awards	2017	"Humble"	Impact Track	Nominated	
BET Hip Hop Awards	2017	"DNA"	Impact Track	Nominated	
BET Hip Hop Awards	2017	Damn	Hip Hop Album of the Year	Won	
BET Hip Hop Awards	2018	Kendrick Lamar	Hot Ticket Performer	Nominated	
BET Hip Hop Awards	2018	Kendrick Lamar	Lyricist of the Year	Won	
BET Hip Hop Awards	2018	Kendrick Lamar	Hustler of the Year	Nominated	
BET Hip Hop Awards	2018	"Loyalty" (featuring Rihanna)	Best Hip Hop Video	Nominated	
BET Hip Hop Awards	2018	"New Freezer" (Rich the Kid featuring Kendrick Lamar)	Sweet 16: Best Featured Verse	Nominated	
BET Hip Hop Awards	2022	"Family Ties" (with Baby Keem)	Best Hip Hop Video	Won	
BET Hip Hop Awards	2022	"Family Ties" (with Baby Keem)	Best Collaboration	Nominated	
BET Hip Hop Awards	2022	"Family Ties" (with Baby Keem)	Impact Track	Nominated	
BET Hip Hop Awards	2022	"The Heart Part 5"	Impact Track	Nominated	
BET Hip Hop Awards	2022	Mr. Morale & the Big Steppers	Hip Hop Album of the Year	Won	
BET Hip Hop Awards	2022	Kendrick Lamar	Hip Hop Artist of the Year	Won	
BET Hip Hop Awards	2022	Kendrick Lamar	Lyricist of the Year	Won	
BET Hip Hop Awards	2022	Kendrick Lamar	Best Live Performer	Won	
BET Hip Hop Awards	2022	Kendrick Lamar and Dave Free	Video Director of the Year	Won	
BET Hip Hop Awards	2023	Kendrick Lamar	Hip Hop Artist of the Year	Won	
BET Hip Hop Awards	2023	Kendrick Lamar	Lyricist of the Year	Won	
BET Hip Hop Awards	2023	Kendrick Lamar	Best Live Performer	Won	
BET Hip Hop Awards	2023	Kendrick Lamar and Dave Free	Video Director of the Year	Won	
BET Hip Hop Awards	2024	Kendrick Lamar	Hip Hop Artist of the Year	Won	
BET Hip Hop Awards	2024	Kendrick Lamar	Lyricist of the Year	Won	
BET Hip Hop Awards	2024	Kendrick Lamar	Hustler of the Year	Nominated	
BET Hip Hop Awards	2024	Kendrick Lamar	Best Live Performer	Nominated	
BET Hip Hop Awards	2024	Kendrick Lamar and Dave Free	Video Director of the Year	Won	
BET Hip Hop Awards	2024	"Not Like Us"	Best Hip Hop Video	Won	
BET Hip Hop Awards	2024	"Not Like Us"	Impact Track	Won	
BET Hip Hop Awards	2024	"Not Like Us"	Song of the Year	Won	
BET Hip Hop Awards	2024	"Like That" (with Future and Metro Boomin)	Song of the Year	Nominated	
BET Hip Hop Awards	2024	"Like That" (with Future and Metro Boomin)	Best Collaboration	Won	
BET Hip Hop Awards	2024	"Like That" (with Future and Metro Boomin)	Sweet 16: Best Featured Verse	Won	
Billboard Music Awards	2013	Good Kid, M.A.A.D City	Top Rap Album	Nominated	
Billboard Music Awards	2016	To Pimp a Butterfly	Top Rap Album	Nominated	
Billboard Music Awards	2018	Kendrick Lamar	Top Artist	Nominated	
Billboard Music Awards	2018	Kendrick Lamar	Top Male Artist	Nominated	
Billboard Music Awards	2018	Kendrick Lamar	Top Billboard 200 Artist	Nominated	
Billboard Music Awards	2018	Kendrick Lamar	Top Hot 100 Artist	Nominated	
Billboard Music Awards	2018	Kendrick Lamar	Top Song Sales Artist	Nominated	
Billboard Music Awards	2018	Kendrick Lamar	Top Streaming Songs Artist	Won	
Billboard Music Awards	2018	Kendrick Lamar	Top Rap Artist	Won	
Billboard Music Awards	2018	Kendrick Lamar	Top Rap Male Artist	Won	
Billboard Music Awards	2018	Kendrick Lamar	Top Rap Tour	Nominated	
Billboard Music Awards	2018	"Humble"	Top Hot 100 Song	Nominated	
Billboard Music Awards	2018	"Humble"	Top Streaming Song (Audio)	Won	
Billboard Music Awards	2018	"Humble"	Top Rap Song	Nominated	
Billboard Music Awards	2018	Damn	Top Billboard 200 Album	Won	
Billboard Music Awards	2018	Damn	Top Selling Album	Nominated	
Billboard Music Awards	2018	Damn	Top Rap Album	Won	
Billboard Music Awards	2018	Black Panther: The Album	Top Soundtrack/Cast Album	Nominated	
Billboard Music Awards	2024	Kendrick Lamar	Top Hot 100 Songwriter	Nominated	
Billboard Music Awards	2024	Kendrick Lamar	Top Streaming Songs Artist	Nominated	
Billboard Music Awards	2024	Kendrick Lamar	Top Rap Artist	Nominated	
Billboard Music Awards	2024	Kendrick Lamar	Top Rap Male Artist	Nominated	
Billboard Music Awards	2024	"Not Like Us"	Top Streaming Song	Nominated	
Billboard Music Awards	2024	"Not Like Us"	Top Rap Song	Won	
Billboard Music Awards	2024	"Like That"	Top Rap Song	Nominated	
Billboard Music Awards	2024	"Like That"	Top Collaboration	Nominated	
Black Reel Awards	2015	"It's On Again" (Alicia Keys featuring Kendrick Lamar)	Best Original or Adapted Song	Nominated	
Black Reel Awards	2019	"All the Stars" (with SZA)	Outstanding Original Song	Won	
Black Reel Awards	2019	"Pray for Me" (with the Weeknd)	Outstanding Original Song	Nominated	
Brit Awards	2016	Kendrick Lamar	International Male Solo Artist	Nominated	
Brit Awards	2018	Kendrick Lamar	International Male Solo Artist	Won	
Brit Awards	2023	Kendrick Lamar	International Male Solo Artist	Nominated	
BMI R&B/Hip Hop Awards	2019	"All the Stars" (with SZA)	35 Most Performed R&B/Hip Hop Songs	Won	
BMI R&B/Hip Hop Awards	2019	"Pray for Me" (with the Weeknd)	35 Most Performed R&B/Hip Hop Songs	Won	
BMI Pop Awards	2019	"Pray for Me" (with the Weeknd)	Award Winning Songs	Won	
Camerimage	2015	"Alright"	Best Music Video	Won	
Camerimage	2015	"Alright"	Best Cinematography in a Music Video	Won	
Camerimage	2017	"Humble"	Best Music Video	Nominated	
Camerimage	2017	"Humble"	Best Cinematography in a Music Video	Nominated	
Camerimage	2025	"Luther" (with SZA)	Best Music Video	Pending	
Camerimage	2025	"Luther" (with SZA)	Best Cinematography in a Music Video	Pending	
Cannes Lions International Festival of Creativity	2018	"Humble"	Excellence in Music Video	Silver Lion	
Cannes Lions International Festival of Creativity	2023	"The Heart Part 5"	Film Craft Lion for Visual Effects	Bronze Lion	
Cannes Lions International Festival of Creativity	2023	"Balcony" (PGLang for Cash App)	Entertainment Lion for Partnerships with Talent	Bronze Lion	
Cannes Lions International Festival of Creativity	2023	"Balcony" (PGLang for Cash App)	Film Craft Lion for Direction	Bronze Lion	
Cannes Lions International Festival of Creativity	2023	We Cry Together – A Short Film	Film Craft Lion for Direction	Grand Prix	
Cannes Lions International Festival of Creativity	2023	We Cry Together – A Short Film	Film Craft Lion for Cinematography	Gold Lion	
Clio Awards	2017	"Element"	Best Music Video	Gold	
Clio Awards	2018	"All the Stars" (with SZA)	Best Music Video	Gold	
Clio Awards	2018	"Humble"	Best Music Video	Silver	
Critics' Choice Movie Awards	2018	"All the Stars" (with SZA)	Best Song	Nominated	
D&AD Awards	2018	"Humble"	Music Video	Graphite Pencil	
D&AD Awards	2018	"Element"	Music Video	Wood Pencil	
D&AD Awards	2018	"Element"	Cinematography for Music Videos	Graphite Pencil	
D&AD Awards	2018	"Element"	Direction for Music Videos	Wood Pencil	
D&AD Awards	2018	"Element"	Editing for Music Videos	Wood Pencil	
Danish Music Awards	2013	Good Kid, M.A.A.D City	International Album of the Year	Nominated	
Danish Music Awards	2015	To Pimp a Butterfly	International Album of the Year	Won	
Danish Music Awards	2017	Damn	International Album of the Year	Won	
Fonogram Awards	2016	To Pimp a Butterfly	Best Foreign Rap or Hip Hop Album of the Year	Nominated	
Fonogram Awards	2017	Untitled Unmastered	Best Foreign Rap or Hip Hop Album of the Year	Nominated	
Fonogram Awards	2018	Damn	Best Foreign Rap or Hip Hop Album of the Year	Won	
Fonogram Awards	2019	Black Panther: The Album	Best Foreign Rap or Hip Hop Album of the Year	Nominated	
GAFFA Awards (Denmark)	2015	Kendrick Lamar	International Male Artist of the Year	Nominated	
GAFFA Awards (Denmark)	2015	To Pimp a Butterfly	International Album of the Year	Nominated	
GAFFA Awards (Denmark)	2018	Kendrick Lamar	International Artist of the Year	Nominated	
GAFFA Awards (Denmark)	2018	Damn	International Album of the Year	Nominated	
GAFFA Awards (Norway)	2017	Kendrick Lamar	International Artist of the Year	Won	
GAFFA Awards (Norway)	2017	Damn	International Album of the Year	Won	
GAFFA Awards (Norway)	2017	"Humble"	International Song of the Year	Won	
GAFFA Awards (Sweden)	2018	Kendrick Lamar	International Artist of the Year	Nominated	
GAFFA Awards (Sweden)	2018	Damn	International Album of the Year	Won	
GAFFA Awards (Sweden)	2018	"Humble"	International Song of the Year	Nominated	
GAFFA Awards (Sweden)	2019	"All the Stars" (with SZA)	International Song of the Year	Nominated	
Gaon Chart Awards	2016	"Don't Wanna Know" (Maroon 5 featuring Kendrick Lamar)	International Song of the Year	Won	
Global Awards	2018	Kendrick Lamar	Best R&B, Hip Hop or Grime	Nominated	
Golden Globe Awards	2018	"All the Stars" (with SZA)	Best Original Song	Nominated	
Grammy Awards	2014	Good Kid, M.A.A.D City	Album of the Year	Nominated	
Grammy Awards	2014	Good Kid, M.A.A.D City	Best Rap Album	Nominated	
Grammy Awards	2014	Kendrick Lamar	Best New Artist	Nominated	
Grammy Awards	2014	"How Many Drinks?" (Miguel featuring Kendrick Lamar)	Best R&B Performance	Nominated	
Grammy Awards	2014	"Swimming Pools (Drank)"	Best Rap Performance	Nominated	
Grammy Awards	2014	"Fuckin' Problems" (ASAP Rocky featuring Drake, 2 Chainz, and Kendrick Lamar)	Best Rap Song	Nominated	
Grammy Awards	2014	"Now or Never" (featuring Mary J. Blige)	Best Rap/Sung Performance	Nominated	
Grammy Awards	2015	"I"	Best Rap Performance	Won	
Grammy Awards	2015	"I"	Best Rap Song	Won	
Grammy Awards	2016	"Alright"	Song of the Year	Nominated	
Grammy Awards	2016	"Alright"	Best Rap Performance	Won	
Grammy Awards	2016	"Alright"	Best Rap Song	Won	
Grammy Awards	2016	"Alright"	Best Music Video	Nominated	
Grammy Awards	2016	To Pimp a Butterfly	Album of the Year	Nominated	
Grammy Awards	2016	To Pimp a Butterfly	Best Rap Album	Won	
Grammy Awards	2016	"Bad Blood" (Taylor Swift featuring Kendrick Lamar)	Best Pop Duo/Group Performance	Nominated	
Grammy Awards	2016	"Bad Blood" (Taylor Swift featuring Kendrick Lamar)	Best Music Video	Won	
Grammy Awards	2016	"Never Catch Me" (with Flying Lotus)	Best Dance Recording	Nominated	
Grammy Awards	2016	"All Day" (Kanye West featuring Theophilus London, Allan Kingdom, and Paul McCartney; credited as songwriter)	Best Rap Song	Nominated	
Grammy Awards	2016	"These Walls" (featuring Bilal, Anna Wise, and Thundercat)	Best Rap/Sung Performance	Won	
Grammy Awards	2017	Lemonade (credited as featured artist)	Album of the Year	Nominated	
Grammy Awards	2017	"Freedom" (Beyoncé featuring Kendrick Lamar)	Best Rap/Sung Performance	Nominated	
Grammy Awards	2018	"Humble"	Record of the Year	Nominated	
Grammy Awards	2018	"Humble"	Best Rap Performance	Won	
Grammy Awards	2018	"Humble"	Best Rap Song	Won	
Grammy Awards	2018	"Humble"	Best Music Video	Won	
Grammy Awards	2018	Damn	Album of the Year	Nominated	
Grammy Awards	2018	Damn	Best Rap Album	Won	
Grammy Awards	2018	"Loyalty" (featuring Rihanna)	Best Rap/Sung Performance	Won	
Grammy Awards	2019	"All the Stars" (with SZA)	Record of the Year	Nominated	
Grammy Awards	2019	"All the Stars" (with SZA)	Song of the Year	Nominated	
Grammy Awards	2019	"All the Stars" (with SZA)	Best Rap/Sung Performance	Nominated	
Grammy Awards	2019	"All the Stars" (with SZA)	Best Song Written for Visual Media	Nominated	
Grammy Awards	2019	Black Panther: The Album	Album of the Year	Nominated	
Grammy Awards	2019	"King's Dead" (Jay Rock featuring Kendrick Lamar, Future, and James Blake)	Best Rap Performance	Won	
Grammy Awards	2019	"King's Dead" (Jay Rock featuring Kendrick Lamar, Future, and James Blake)	Best Rap Song	Nominated	
Grammy Awards	2019	"Win" (with Jay Rock)	Best Rap Song	Nominated	
Grammy Awards	2022	"Family Ties" (with Baby Keem)	Best Rap Performance	Won	
Grammy Awards	2022	"Family Ties" (with Baby Keem)	Best Rap Song	Nominated	
Grammy Awards	2023	"The Heart Part 5"	Record of the Year	Nominated	
Grammy Awards	2023	"The Heart Part 5"	Song of the Year	Nominated	
Grammy Awards	2023	"The Heart Part 5"	Best Rap Performance	Won	
Grammy Awards	2023	"The Heart Part 5"	Best Rap Song	Won	
Grammy Awards	2023	"The Heart Part 5"	Best Music Video	Nominated	
Grammy Awards	2023	Mr. Morale & the Big Steppers	Album of the Year	Nominated	
Grammy Awards	2023	Mr. Morale & the Big Steppers	Best Rap Album	Won	
Grammy Awards	2023	"Die Hard" (featuring Blxst and Amanda Reifer)	Best Melodic Rap Performance	Nominated	
Grammy Awards	2024	"The Hillbillies" (with Baby Keem)	Best Rap Performance	Nominated	
Grammy Awards	2024	"Count Me Out"	Best Music Video	Nominated	
Grammy Awards	2024	Live from Paris, The Big Steppers Tour	Best Music Film	Nominated	
Grammy Awards	2025	"Not Like Us"	Record of the Year	Won	
Grammy Awards	2025	"Not Like Us"	Song of the Year	Won	
Grammy Awards	2025	"Not Like Us"	Best Rap Performance	Won	
Grammy Awards	2025	"Not Like Us"	Best Rap Song	Won	
Grammy Awards	2025	"Not Like Us"	Best Music Video	Won	
Grammy Awards	2025	"Like That" (with Future and Metro Boomin)	Best Rap Performance	Nominated	
Grammy Awards	2025	"Like That" (with Future and Metro Boomin)	Best Rap Song	Nominated	
Grammy Awards	2026	"Luther" (with SZA)	Record of the Year	Won	
Grammy Awards	2026	"Luther" (with SZA)	Song of the Year	Nominated	
Grammy Awards	2026	"Luther" (with SZA)	Best Melodic Rap Performance	Won	
Grammy Awards	2026	GNX	Album of the Year	Nominated	
Grammy Awards	2026	GNX	Best Rap Album	Won	
Grammy Awards	2026	"30 for 30" (with SZA)	Best Pop Duo/Group Performance	Nominated	
Grammy Awards	2026	"Chains and Whips" (with Clipse)	Best Rap Performance	Won	
Grammy Awards	2026	"TV Off" (featuring Lefty Gunplay)	Best Rap Performance	Nominated	
Grammy Awards	2026	"TV Off" (featuring Lefty Gunplay)	Best Rap Song	Won	
Grammy Awards	2027	"Good Flirts" (with Baby Keem and Momo Boyd)	Best Rap Performance	Pending	
HipHopDX Year End Awards	2011	"HiiiPower"	Verse of the Year	Won	
HipHopDX Year End Awards	2011	Section.80	Album of the Year	Won	
HipHopDX Year End Awards	2012	Kendrick Lamar	Emcee of the Year	Won	
HipHopDX Year End Awards	2012	Good Kid, M.A.A.D City	Album of the Year	Won	
HipHopDX Year End Awards	2012	Good Kid, M.A.A.D City	Readers' Choice Album of the Year	Won	
HipHopDX Year End Awards	2013	Kendrick Lamar	Emcee of the Year	Won	
HipHopDX Year End Awards	2013	"Control" (with Big Sean and Jay Electronica)	Verse of the Year	Won	
HipHopDX Year End Awards	2013	"Kendrick Lamar Restores Friendly Competition With Control"	Story of the Year	Won	
HipHopDX Year End Awards	2013	"BET Hip Hop Awards Cypher"	Freestyle of the Year	Won	
HipHopDX Year End Awards	2013	"U.O.E.N.O" (Black Hippy remix)	Collaboration of the Year	Won	
HipHopDX Year End Awards	2014	"I"	Video of the Year	Won	
HipHopDX Year End Awards	2015	To Pimp a Butterfly	Album of the Year	Won	
HipHopDX Year End Awards	2015	Kendrick Lamar	Emcee of the Year	Won	
HipHopDX Year End Awards	2015	"Alright"	Video of the Year	Won	
HipHopDX Year End Awards	2017	Damn	Rap Album of the Year	Won	
HipHopDX Year End Awards	2017	Kendrick Lamar	Rapper of the Year	Won	
HipHopDX Year End Awards	2017	"Duckworth"	Best Song of the Year	Won	
HipHopDX Year End Awards	2017	"Humble"	Video of the Year	Won	
HipHopDX Year End Awards	2022	"The Heart Part 5"	Rap & Hip Hop Music Video of the Year	Won	
HipHopDX Year End Awards	2022	"We Cry Together"	Rap & Hip Hop Music Video of the Year	Nominated	
HipHopDX Year End Awards	2022	Kendrick Lamar	Rapper of the Year	Won	
HipHopDX Year End Awards	2022	Mr. Morale & the Big Steppers	Hip Hop Album of the Year	Won	
HipHopDX Year End Awards	2022	"Count Me Out"	Hip Hop Song of the Year	Nominated	
Hollywood Music in Media Awards	2018	"All the Stars" (with SZA)	Original Song – Sci-Fi/Fantasy/Horror Film	Won	
Hollywood Music in Media Awards	2018	Black Panther: The Album	Soundtrack Album	Won	
Houston Film Critics Society	2018	"All the Stars" (with SZA)	Best Original Song	Nominated	
iHeartRadio Music Awards	2016	"Bad Blood" (with Taylor Swift)	Best Collaboration	Nominated	
iHeartRadio Music Awards	2018	"Don't Wanna Know" (with Maroon 5)	Best Collaboration	Nominated	
iHeartRadio Music Awards	2018	"Humble"	Hip Hop Song of the Year	Nominated	
iHeartRadio Music Awards	2018	Kendrick Lamar	Hip Hop Artist of the Year	Won	
iHeartRadio Music Awards	2018	Damn	Hip Hop Album of the Year	Won	
iHeartRadio Music Awards	2019	Kendrick Lamar	Male Artist of the Year	Nominated	
iHeartRadio Music Awards	2019	Kendrick Lamar	Hip Hop Artist of the Year	Nominated	
iHeartRadio Music Awards	2020	"Love" (featuring Zacari)	Titanium Award	Won	
iHeartRadio Music Awards	2023	"N95"	Best Lyrics	Nominated	
iHeartRadio Music Awards	2025	Kendrick Lamar	Artist of the Year	Nominated	
iHeartRadio Music Awards	2025	Kendrick Lamar	Hip-Hop Artist of the Year	Nominated	
iHeartRadio Music Awards	2025	"Not Like Us"	Song of the Year	Nominated	
iHeartRadio Music Awards	2025	"Not Like Us"	Hip-Hop Song of the Year	Won	
iHeartRadio Music Awards	2025	"Not Like Us"	Best Lyrics	Nominated	
iHeartRadio Music Awards	2025	"Not Like Us"	Best Music Video	Nominated	
iHeartRadio Music Awards	2025	"Like That" (with Future and Metro Boomin)	Best Collaboration	Nominated	
iHeartRadio Music Awards	2025	"Like That" (with Future and Metro Boomin)	Hip-Hop Song of the Year	Nominated	
iHeartRadio Music Awards	2025	Ken and Friends	Favorite Surprise Guest	Nominated	
iHeartRadio Music Awards	2026	Kendrick Lamar	Artist of the Year	Nominated	
iHeartRadio Music Awards	2026	Kendrick Lamar	Hip-Hop Artist of the Year	Won	
iHeartRadio Music Awards	2026	GNX	Hip-Hop Album of the Year	Won	
iHeartRadio Music Awards	2026	"Luther" (with SZA)	Song of the Year	Nominated	
iHeartRadio Music Awards	2026	"Luther" (with SZA)	Best Collaboration	Nominated	
iHeartRadio Music Awards	2026	"Luther" (with SZA)	Hip-Hop Song of the Year	Won	
Juno Awards	2018	Damn	International Album of the Year	Won	
Juno Awards	2019	"Pray for Me" (with the Weeknd)	Single of the Year	Nominated	
London International Awards	2018	"All the Stars" (with SZA)	Music Video: Visual Effects	Won	
London International Awards	2018	"All the Stars" (with SZA)	Music Video: Best Music Video	Nominated	
London International Awards	2018	"All the Stars" (with SZA)	Music Video: Cinematography	Nominated	
MOBO Awards	2013	Kendrick Lamar	International Artist	Won	
MOBO Awards	2015	To Pimp A Butterfly	Best International Album	Nominated	
MOBO Awards	2017	Kendrick Lamar	Best International Act	Nominated	
MOBO Awards	2022	Kendrick Lamar	Best International Act	Nominated	
MOBO Awards	2025	Kendrick Lamar	Best International Act	Nominated	
MTV Video Music Awards	2013	"Fuckin' Problems" (ASAP Rocky featuring Drake, 2 Chainz, and Kendrick Lamar)	Best Hip Hop Video	Nominated	
MTV Video Music Awards	2013	"Swimming Pools (Drank)"	Best Hip Hop Video	Nominated	
MTV Video Music Awards	2013	"Swimming Pools (Drank)"	Best Male Video	Nominated	
MTV Video Music Awards	2015	"Alright"	Video of the Year	Nominated	
MTV Video Music Awards	2015	"Alright"	Best Male Video	Nominated	
MTV Video Music Awards	2015	"Alright"	Best Hip Hop Video	Nominated	
MTV Video Music Awards	2015	"Alright"	Best Direction	Won	
MTV Video Music Awards	2015	"Bad Blood" (Taylor Swift featuring Kendrick Lamar)	Video of the Year	Won	
MTV Video Music Awards	2015	"Bad Blood" (Taylor Swift featuring Kendrick Lamar)	Best Collaboration	Won	
MTV Video Music Awards	2015	"Bad Blood" (Taylor Swift featuring Kendrick Lamar)	Best Direction	Nominated	
MTV Video Music Awards	2015	"Bad Blood" (Taylor Swift featuring Kendrick Lamar)	Best Visual Effects	Nominated	
MTV Video Music Awards	2015	"Bad Blood" (Taylor Swift featuring Kendrick Lamar)	Best Art Direction	Nominated	
MTV Video Music Awards	2015	"Bad Blood" (Taylor Swift featuring Kendrick Lamar)	Best Editing	Nominated	
MTV Video Music Awards	2015	"Bad Blood" (Taylor Swift featuring Kendrick Lamar)	Best Cinematography	Nominated	
MTV Video Music Awards	2015	"Never Catch Me" (Flying Lotus featuring Kendrick Lamar)	Best Cinematography	Won	
MTV Video Music Awards	2015	"Never Catch Me" (Flying Lotus featuring Kendrick Lamar)	Best Choreography	Nominated	
MTV Video Music Awards	2016	"Freedom" (Beyoncé featuring Kendrick Lamar)	Best Collaboration	Nominated	
MTV Video Music Awards	2017	"Humble"	Video of the Year	Won	
MTV Video Music Awards	2017	"Humble"	Best Hip Hop Video	Won	
MTV Video Music Awards	2017	"Humble"	Best Cinematography	Won	
MTV Video Music Awards	2017	"Humble"	Best Direction	Won	
MTV Video Music Awards	2017	"Humble"	Best Art Direction	Won	
MTV Video Music Awards	2017	"Humble"	Best Visual Effects	Won	
MTV Video Music Awards	2017	"Humble"	Best Choreography	Nominated	
MTV Video Music Awards	2017	Kendrick Lamar	Artist of the Year	Nominated	
MTV Video Music Awards	2018	"All the Stars" (with SZA)	Best Visual Effects	Won	
MTV Video Music Awards	2019	"Tints" (Anderson .Paak featuring Kendrick Lamar)	Best Editing	Nominated	
MTV Video Music Awards	2019	"Tints" (Anderson .Paak featuring Kendrick Lamar)	Best Cinematography	Nominated	
MTV Video Music Awards	2022	"N95"	Best Hip Hop	Nominated	
MTV Video Music Awards	2022	"N95"	Best Cinematography	Nominated	
MTV Video Music Awards	2022	"Family Ties" (with Baby Keem)	Best Cinematography	Nominated	
MTV Video Music Awards	2022	"Family Ties" (with Baby Keem)	Best Direction	Nominated	
MTV Video Music Awards	2022	"Family Ties" (with Baby Keem)	Best Editing	Nominated	
MTV Video Music Awards	2022	"The Heart Part 5"	Video for Good	Nominated	
MTV Video Music Awards	2022	"The Heart Part 5"	Best Visual Effects	Nominated	
MTV Video Music Awards	2023	"Rich Spirit"	Best Editing	Nominated	
MTV Video Music Awards	2023	"Count Me Out"	Best Direction	Nominated	
MTV Video Music Awards	2023	"Count Me Out"	Best Cinematography	Nominated	
MTV Video Music Awards	2024	"Not Like Us"	Song of the Year	Nominated	
MTV Video Music Awards	2024	"Not Like Us"	Song of Summer	Nominated	
MTV Video Music Awards	2024	"Like That" (with Future and Metro Boomin)	Song of Summer	Nominated	
MTV Video Music Awards	2025	"Not Like Us"	Video of the Year	Nominated	
MTV Video Music Awards	2025	"Not Like Us"	Best Hip Hop Video	Nominated	
MTV Video Music Awards	2025	"Not Like Us"	Best Direction	Nominated	
MTV Video Music Awards	2025	"Not Like Us"	Best Art Direction	Nominated	
MTV Video Music Awards	2025	"Not Like Us"	Best Cinematography	Won	
MTV Video Music Awards	2025	"Not Like Us"	Best Editing	Nominated	
MTV Video Music Awards	2025	"Not Like Us"	Best Choreography	Nominated	
MTV Video Music Awards	2025	"GNX"	Best Album	Nominated	
MTV Video Music Awards	2025	"Luther" (with SZA)	Best Collaboration	Nominated	
MTV Video Music Awards	2025	Himself	Artist of the Year	Nominated	
MTV Europe Music Awards	2015	"Bad Blood" (Taylor Swift featuring Kendrick Lamar)	Best Song	Won	
MTV Europe Music Awards	2015	"Bad Blood" (Taylor Swift featuring Kendrick Lamar)	Best Video	Nominated	
MTV Europe Music Awards	2015	"Bad Blood" (Taylor Swift featuring Kendrick Lamar)	Best Collaboration	Nominated	
MTV Europe Music Awards	2015	"Alright"	Best Video	Nominated	
MTV Europe Music Awards	2015	Kendrick Lamar	Best Hip Hop	Nominated	
MTV Europe Music Awards	2015	Kendrick Lamar	Best US Act	Nominated	
MTV Europe Music Awards	2017	Kendrick Lamar	Best Artist	Nominated	
MTV Europe Music Awards	2017	Kendrick Lamar	Best Hip Hop	Nominated	
MTV Europe Music Awards	2017	Kendrick Lamar	Best US Act	Nominated	
MTV Europe Music Awards	2017	"Humble"	Best Video	Won	
MTV Europe Music Awards	2022	"The Heart Part 5"	Best Video	Nominated	
MTV Europe Music Awards	2022	"The Heart Part 5"	Video for Good	Nominated	
MTV Europe Music Awards	2022	Kendrick Lamar	Best Hip Hop	Nominated	
MTV Europe Music Awards	2022	Kendrick Lamar	Best Live	Nominated	
MTV Europe Music Awards	2024	Kendrick Lamar	Best Hip Hop	Nominated	
MTV Europe Music Awards	2024	Kendrick Lamar	Best US Act	Nominated	
MTV Europe Music Awards	2024	"Not Like Us"	Best Video	Nominated	
MTV Europe Music Awards	2024	"Like That" (with Future and Metro Boomin)	Best Collaboration	Nominated	
MTV Video Music Awards Japan	2013	"Fuckin' Problems" (ASAP Rocky featuring Drake, 2 Chainz, and Kendrick Lamar)	Best Hip Hop Video	Won	
MTV Video Music Awards Japan	2013	"Swimming Pools (Drank)"	Best Hip Hop Video	Nominated	
MTVU Woodie Awards	2012	Kendrick Lamar	Breaking Woodie	Nominated	
MTVU Woodie Awards	2013	Kendrick Lamar	Woodie of the Year	Nominated	
Much Music Video Awards	2015	"I"	Best International Video	Nominated	
Much Music Video Awards	2017	Kendrick Lamar	International Artist of The Year	Nominated	
Much Music Video Awards	2017	Kendrick Lamar	Most Buzzworthy International Artist or Group	Nominated	
Much Music Video Awards	2018	Kendrick Lamar	Best Hip Hop Artist or Group	Nominated	
Much Music Video Awards	2018	"Pray For Me" (with the Weeknd)	Best Collaboration	Nominated	
Much Music Video Awards	2018	"All The Stars" (with SZA)	Best Collaboration	Nominated	
Music Awards Japan	2025	"Not Like Us"	Best International Hip Hop/Rap Song in Japan	Won	
Music Awards Japan	2025	"Not Like Us"	Best of Listeners' Choice: International Song	Nominated	
Music Awards Japan	2025	"Luther" (with SZA)	Best of Listeners' Choice: International Song	Nominated	
Music Awards Japan	2025	"Luther" (with SZA)	Best International Hip Hop/Rap Song in Japan	Nominated	
Myx Music Awards	2016	"Bad Blood" (Taylor Swift featuring Kendrick Lamar)	Favorite International Video	Won	
NAACP Image Awards	2015	Kendrick Lamar	Outstanding Male Artist	Nominated	
NAACP Image Awards	2015	"I"	Outstanding Music Video	Nominated	
NAACP Image Awards	2015	"I"	Outstanding Song	Nominated	
NAACP Image Awards	2016	Kendrick Lamar	Outstanding Male Artist	Nominated	
NAACP Image Awards	2017	"Freedom" (Beyoncé featuring Kendrick Lamar)	Outstanding Duo, Group or Collaboration	Won	
NAACP Image Awards	2017	"Freedom" (Beyoncé featuring Kendrick Lamar)	Outstanding Song, Contemporary	Won	
NAACP Image Awards	2017	Untitled Unmastered	Outstanding Album	Nominated	
NAACP Image Awards	2017	Kendrick Lamar	Outstanding Male Artist	Nominated	
NAACP Image Awards	2018	Kendrick Lamar	Outstanding Male Artist	Nominated	
NAACP Image Awards	2018	"Loyalty" (featuring Rihanna)	Outstanding Duo, Group or Collaboration	Won	
NAACP Image Awards	2018	"Humble"	Outstanding Song, Contemporary	Won	
NAACP Image Awards	2018	Damn	Outstanding Album	Won	
NAACP Image Awards	2019	Power	Outstanding Guest Performance in a Comedy or Drama Series	Nominated	
NAACP Image Awards	2019	"All The Stars" (with SZA)	Outstanding Duo, Group or Collaboration	Won	
NAACP Image Awards	2019	"All The Stars" (with SZA)	Outstanding Music Video/Visual Album	Nominated	
NAACP Image Awards	2019	Black Panther: The Album	Outstanding Soundtrack/Compilation	Won	
NAACP Image Awards	2023	Mr. Morale & the Big Steppers	Outstanding Album	Nominated	
NAACP Image Awards	2023	Kendrick Lamar	Outstanding Male Artist	Nominated	
NAACP Image Awards	2023	"Die Hard" (featuring Blxst and Amanda Reifer)	Outstanding Duo, Group or Collaboration (Traditional)	Nominated	
NAACP Image Awards	2023	"The Heart Part 5"	Outstanding Music Video/Visual Album	Nominated	
NAACP Image Awards	2023	"The Heart Part 5"	Outstanding Hip Hop/Rap Song	Nominated	
NAACP Image Awards	2025	Kendrick Lamar	Entertainer of the Year	Nominated	
NAACP Image Awards	2025	Kendrick Lamar	Outstanding Male Artist	Nominated	
NAACP Image Awards	2025	"Not Like Us"	Outstanding Music Video/Visual Album	Won	
NAACP Image Awards	2025	"Not Like Us"	Outstanding Hip Hop/Rap Song	Won	
NAACP Image Awards	2026	Kendrick Lamar	Entertainer of the Year	Pending	
NAACP Image Awards	2026	Kendrick Lamar	Outstanding Male Artist	Won	
NAACP Image Awards	2026	"Chains & Whips" (featuring Clipse, Pharrell Williams, Pusha T, Malice)	Outstanding Duo, Group or Collaboration (Traditional)	Nominated	
NAACP Image Awards	2026	"Chains & Whips" (featuring Clipse, Pharrell Williams, Pusha T, Malice)	Outstanding Hip Hop/Rap Song	Nominated	
NAACP Image Awards	2026	"Luther" (featuring SZA)	Outstanding Music Video	Won	
Nickelodeon Kids' Choice Awards	2016	"Bad Blood" (Taylor Swift featuring Kendrick Lamar)	Favorite Song of the Year	Nominated	
Nickelodeon Kids' Choice Awards	2016	"Bad Blood" (Taylor Swift featuring Kendrick Lamar)	Favorite Collaboration	Nominated	
Nickelodeon Kids' Choice Awards	2018	Kendrick Lamar	Favorite Male Artist	Nominated	
Nickelodeon Kids' Choice Awards	2018	"Humble"	Favorite Song	Nominated	
Nickelodeon Kids' Choice Awards	2023	Kendrick Lamar	Favorite Male Artist	Nominated	
Nickelodeon Kids' Choice Awards	2025	Kendrick Lamar	Favorite Male Artist	Nominated	
Nickelodeon Kids' Choice Awards	2025	"Squabble Up"	Favorite Song	Nominated	
Nickelodeon Kids' Choice Awards	2025	GNX	Favorite Album	Nominated	
Nickelodeon Kids' Choice Awards	2025	"Luther" (with SZA)	Favorite Music Collaboration	Won	
NME Awards	2016	Kendrick Lamar	Best International Solo Artist	Nominated	
NME Awards	2016	To Pimp a Butterfly	Best Album	Nominated	
NME Awards	2018	Kendrick Lamar	Best International Solo Artist	Nominated	
NME Awards	2018	"Humble"	Best Track	Nominated	
NRJ Music Awards	2015	"Bad Blood" (Taylor Swift featuring Kendrick Lamar)	Video of the Year	Won	
PLAY - Portuguese Music Awards	2019	"All the Stars" (with SZA)	Best International Song	Won	
PLAY - Portuguese Music Awards	2019	Kendrick Lamar	Best International Artist	Won	
People's Choice Awards	2016	Kendrick Lamar	Favorite Hip Hop Artist	Nominated	
People's Choice Awards	2016	"Bad Blood" (Taylor Swift featuring Kendrick Lamar)	Favorite Song	Nominated	
People's Choice Awards	2017	Kendrick Lamar	Favorite Hip Hop Artist	Nominated	
People's Choice Awards	2022	Mr. Morale & the Big Steppers	The Album of 2022	Nominated	
People's Choice Awards	2022	Kendrick Lamar	The Male Artist of 2022	Nominated	
Primetime Emmy Awards	2022	The Pepsi Super Bowl LVI Halftime Show	Outstanding Variety Special (Live)	Won	
Primetime Emmy Awards	2025	Apple Music Super Bowl LIX Halftime Show	Outstanding Variety Special (Live)	Nominated	
Primetime Emmy Awards	2025	Apple Music Super Bowl LIX Halftime Show	Outstanding Music Direction	Won	
Pulitzer Prize	2018	Damn	Pulitzer Prize for Music	Won	
Q Awards	2017	Damn	Best Album	Nominated	
Q Awards	2017	"Humble"	Best Track	Nominated	
Q Awards	2018	Kendrick Lamar	Best Act in the World Today	Nominated	
RTHK International Pop Poll Awards	2017	"The Greatest" (Sia featuring Kendrick Lamar)	Top Ten International Gold Songs	Nominated	
Satellite Awards	2019	"All the Stars" (with SZA)	Best Original Song	Nominated	
Soul Train Music Awards	2013	Kendrick Lamar	Best New Artist	Nominated	
Soul Train Music Awards	2013	Good Kid, M.A.A.D City	Album of the Year	Won	
Soul Train Music Awards	2013	"How Many Drinks?" (Miguel featuring Kendrick Lamar)	Best Collaboration	Nominated	
Soul Train Music Awards	2013	"Poetic Justice" (featuring Drake)	Best Hip Hop Song of the Year	Nominated	
Soul Train Music Awards	2013	"Poetic Justice" (featuring Drake)	Song of the Year	Nominated	
Soul Train Music Awards	2013	"Poetic Justice" (featuring Drake)	Video of the Year	Nominated	
Soul Train Music Awards	2015	"Alright"	Best Hip Hop Song of the Year	Won	
Soul Train Music Awards	2015	"Alright"	Video of the Year	Nominated	
Soul Train Music Awards	2016	"Freedom" (Beyoncé featuring Kendrick Lamar)	Best Collaboration	Nominated	
Soul Train Music Awards	2017	"Humble"	Rhythm & Bars Award	Nominated	
Soul Train Music Awards	2018	"Doves in the Wind" (SZA featuring Kendrick Lamar)	Best Collaboration	Nominated	
Soul Train Music Awards	2023	"America Has a Problem" (Beyoncé featuring Kendrick Lamar)	Best Collaboration	Nominated	
Spike Video Game Awards	2013	"A.D.H.D."	Best Song in a Game	Nominated	
TEC Awards	2017	Damn	Outstanding Creative Achievement: Record Production/Album	Nominated	
Teen Choice Awards	2015	"Bad Blood" (Taylor Swift featuring Kendrick Lamar)	Choice Music: Break-Up Song	Won	
Teen Choice Awards	2015	"Bad Blood" (Taylor Swift featuring Kendrick Lamar)	Choice Music: Summer Song	Nominated	
Teen Choice Awards	2015	"Bad Blood" (Taylor Swift featuring Kendrick Lamar)	Choice Music: Collaboration	Won	
Teen Choice Awards	2017	Kendrick Lamar	Choice Music: R&B/Hip Hop Artist	Nominated	
Teen Choice Awards	2017	"Don't Wanna Know" (Maroon 5 featuring Kendrick Lamar)	Choice Pop Song	Nominated	
Teen Choice Awards	2018	"All the Stars" (with SZA)	Choice Music: R&B/Hip Hop Song	Nominated	
Teen Choice Awards	2018	"Love" (featuring Zacari)	Choice Song: Male Artist	Nominated	
Teen Choice Awards	2018	"Pray for Me" (with The Weeknd)	Choice Music: Collaboration	Nominated	
Teen Choice Awards	2018	The Championship Tour (with Top Dawg Entertainment artists)	Choice Music: Summer Tour	Nominated	
Telehit Awards	2015	"Bad Blood" (Taylor Swift featuring Kendrick Lamar)	Video of the Year	Won	
UK Music Video Awards	2015	"Alright"	Video Of The Year	Won	
UK Music Video Awards	2015	"Alright"	Best Urban Video - International	Won	
UK Music Video Awards	2015	"Alright"	Best Cinematography	Won	
UK Music Video Awards	2015	"Never Catch Me" (Flying Lotus featuring Kendrick Lamar)	Best Alternative Video	Won	
UK Music Video Awards	2015	"Never Catch Me" (Flying Lotus featuring Kendrick Lamar)	Best Choreography in a Video	Nominated	
UK Music Video Awards	2015	Kendrick Lamar	Best Artist	Nominated	
UK Music Video Awards	2017	Kendrick Lamar	Best Artist	Won	
UK Music Video Awards	2017	"Humble"	Best Urban Video - International	Nominated	
UK Music Video Awards	2017	"Humble"	Vevo MUST SEE Award	Nominated	
UK Music Video Awards	2017	"Humble"	Best Production Design in a Video	Nominated	
UK Music Video Awards	2017	"Element"	Best Urban Video - International	Nominated	
UK Music Video Awards	2017	"Element"	Best Styling in a Video	Nominated	
UK Music Video Awards	2017	"Element"	Best Cinematography in a Video	Nominated	
UK Music Video Awards	2018	"All the Stars" (with SZA)	Best Urban Video - International	Nominated	
UK Music Video Awards	2022	"The Heart Part 5"	Best Hip Hop/Grime/Rap Video - International	Nominated	
UK Music Video Awards	2022	"The Heart Part 5"	Best Performance in a Video	Nominated	
UK Music Video Awards	2022	"The Heart Part 5"	Best Visual Effects in a Video	Nominated	
UK Music Video Awards	2023	"Count Me Out"	Best Hip Hop/Grime/Rap Video - International	Nominated	
UK Music Video Awards	2023	"We Cry Together"	Best Special Video Project	Won	
Variety Hitmakers Awards	2017	Kendrick Lamar	Hitmaker of the Year	Won	
Webby Awards	2017	"Swimming Pools (Drank)"	Best Video Remixes/Mashups	Won	
World Soundtrack Awards	2018	"Black Panther"	Best Original Song Written Directly for a Film	Won	
XXL Awards	2013	Kendrick Lamar	Rapper of the Year	Won	
XXL Awards	2013	Good Kid, M.A.A.D City	Album of the Year	Won	
XXL Awards	2013	Kendrick Lamar	Breakout Artist of the Year	Nominated	
XXL Awards	2013	"The Recipe" (remix; with Jay Rock, Schoolboy Q, & Ab-Soul)	Best Remix	Nominated	
XXL Awards	2013	Good Kid, M.A.A.D City	Best Debut Album	Won	
XXL Awards	2013	"Power Circle" (Rick Ross featuring Gunplay, Kendrick Lamar, Stalley, Wale, and Meek Mill)	Best Posse Cut	Nominated	
XXL Awards	2013	"Fuckin' Problems" (ASAP Rocky featuring Drake, 2 Chainz, and Kendrick Lamar)	Best Posse Cut	Nominated	
XXL Awards	2013	Kendrick Lamar	YouTube Breakthrough	Nominated	
XXL Awards	2013	Kendrick Lamar	50 Artists to Watch	Placed	
XXL Awards	2013	"Blessed" (Schoolboy Q featuring Kendrick Lamar)	Best Guest Verse on a Hip Hop Record	Nominated	
XXL Awards	2022	"Family Ties" (with Baby Keem)	Song of the Year	Nominated	
XXL Awards	2022	"Family Ties" (with Baby Keem)	Video of the Year	Nominated	
XXL Awards	2023	Kendrick Lamar	Artist of the Year	Nominated	
XXL Awards	2023	Mr. Morale & the Big Steppers	Album of the Year	Won	
XXL Awards	2023	"The Heart Part 5"	Song of the Year	Nominated	
XXL Awards	2023	Kendrick Lamar	Male Rapper of the Year	Won	
XXL Awards	2023	Kendrick Lamar	Lyricist of the Year	Won	
XXL Awards	2023	Kendrick Lamar	Performer of the Year	Won	
XXL Awards	2023	"The Heart Part 5"	Video of the Year	Nominated	
XXL Awards	2023	Kendrick Lamar	The People's Champ	Nominated	
XXL Awards	2024	Kendrick Lamar	Performer of the Year	Nominated	
XXL Awards	2024	Kendrick Lamar	The People's Champ	Nominated	
XXL Awards	2025	Kendrick Lamar	Artist of the Year	Won	
XXL Awards	2025	Kendrick Lamar	Male Rapper of the Year	Won	
XXL Awards	2025	Kendrick Lamar	Lyricist of the Year	Won	
XXL Awards	2025	Kendrick Lamar	The People's Champ	Nominated	
XXL Awards	2025	GNX	Album of the Year	Won	
XXL Awards	2025	“Squabble Up”	Video of the Year	Nominated	
XXL Awards	2025	"Not Like Us"	Video of the Year	Won	
XXL Awards	2025	"Not Like Us"	Song of the Year	Won	
XXL Awards	2025	"Euphoria"	Song of the Year	Nominated	
XXL Awards	2025	"Like That" (with Future & Metro Boomin)	Song of the Year	Nominated	
XXL Awards	2026	Kendrick Lamar	Artist of the Year	Nominated	
XXL Awards	2026	Kendrick Lamar	Male Rapper of the Year	Won	
XXL Awards	2026	Kendrick Lamar	Performer of the Year	Nominated	
XXL Awards	2026	Kendrick Lamar	The People's Champ	Nominated	
XXL Awards	2026	“Chains & Whips” (with Clipse)	Song of the Year	Won	
XXL Awards	2026	“Chains & Whips” (with Clipse)	Verse of the Year	Nominated	
XXL Awards	2026	"Luther" (with SZA)	Video of the Year	Won	

== Other accolades ==
=== Guinness World Records ===
Year the record was awarded, title of the record, and the record holder
Year	Record	Record holder	Ref.
2022	Most Best Male Hip Hop Artist awards won at the BET Awards	Lamar	

=== Listicles ===
Name of publisher, name of listicle, year(s) listed, and placement result
Publisher	Listicle	Year(s)	Result	Ref.
Billboard	The 10 Best Rappers of All Time	2015	9th	
Billboard	The 100 Greatest Music Video Artists of All Time	2020	12th	
Billboard	50 Greatest Rappers of All Time	2023	2nd	
CNN	The 10 Artists Who Transformed Music in the 2010s	2019	Placed	
Consequence	The 100 Greatest Albums of All Time	2022	7th (To Pimp a Butterfly)	
Forbes	Forbes 30 Under 30	2017	Placed	
Insider	The 20 Most Important Artists from the Past 10 Years	2019	Placed	
Madame Tussauds	Hot 100	2025	Placed	
People	Sexiest Men Alive	2022	Finalist	
Pitchfork	The 200 Most Important Artists of Pitchfork’s First 25 Years (under "The Icons")	2021	Placed	
Rolling Stone	500 Greatest Albums of All Time	2020	19th (To Pimp a Butterfly); 115th (Good Kid, M.A.A.D City); 175th (Damn)	
Rolling Stone	100 Greatest Music Videos of All Time	2021	73rd ("Humble")	
Rolling Stone	200 Greatest Hip Hop Albums of All Time	2022	5th (To Pimp a Butterfly); 38th (Good Kid, M.A.A.D City); 60th (Damn)	
Rolling Stone	50 Greatest Concept Albums of All Time	2022	1st (Good Kid, M.A.A.D City)	
Time	Time 100 (under "Artists" with tribute written by Alicia Garza)	2016	Placed	
Variety	Variety500: The 500 Most Important People in Global Media	2018	Placed	
Variety	Hollywood's New Leaders (under "The Creatives")	2016	Placed	
Wired	The 10 Best Artists of a Decade That Atomized Music	2019	Placed	

=== State and cultural honors ===
Name of country, year given, and name of honor
Country	Year	Honor	Ref.
United States	2015	California State Senate's Generational Icon	
United States	2016	Key to the City of Compton, California	
