= Good Flirts =

2026 single by Baby Keem featuring Kendrick Lamar and Momo Boyd

Single by Baby Keem featuring Kendrick Lamar and Momo Boyd

from the album Casino
- Released: March 6, 2026
- Length: 3:52
- Label: PGLang; Columbia
- Songwriters: Hykeem Carter; Kendrick Duckworth; Kayla Le; Cydel Young; Teo Halm; Tobias Breuer; Teddy Danso Sarpong; Burt Bacharach; Hal David; Lonnie Lynn; James Yancey; Bobby Caldwell; Bruce Malament; Norman Harris
- Producers: Baby Keem; Halm; Rascal; Whatssarp

Baby Keem singles chronology
"Leavemealone" (2023)	"Good Flirts" (2026)

Kendrick Lamar singles chronology
"Backd00r" (2025)	"Good Flirts" (2026)	"How to Pray" (2026)

Music video
- "Good Flirts" on YouTube

"Good Flirts" is a song by American rapper Baby Keem featuring American rapper Kendrick Lamar and Momo Boyd of Infinity Song. It was initially released on February 20, 2026, as the fourth track from Keem's second studio album, Casino, and was later serviced to US rhythmic contemporary radio on March 6 as the album's lead single. The song was produced by Keem himself, Teo Halm, Rascal and Whatssarp. It contains a sample of "Walk On By" by the Undisputed Truth.

== Background ==
According to Momo Boyd, Kendrick Lamar's manager Dave Free selected her to feature on the song. He had planned for her guest appearance as early as 2022, when they began following each other. They kept in loose contact for the next couple of years, and in November 2025 he attended her Infinity Song concert in Los Angeles, though they were not able to meet. Boyd first heard "Good Flirts" while on tour. She considered it a challenge, as her style differed from Keem's, and was also sick with a fever, but took part nonetheless. Boyd felt that her feature was "the beginning" for her.

== Composition and lyrics ==
The song contains a downtempo "Motown" beat, over which Baby Keem sings flirtatiously about an on-again, off-again girlfriend. Momo Boyd performs the chorus and later a call-and-response with Kendrick Lamar, who exhibits the same playful tone, interpolates "The Light" by Common and references rapper Young Thug's leaked phone call with his girlfriend Mariah the Scientist during his incarceration amid the YSL Records racketeering trial ("Shit, I gossip with my bitch like I'm Young Thug too"). Lamar also raps about watching the film Sinners while hanging on the couch, his admiration for his partner's booty, and wondering if God might be a woman.

== Critical reception ==
The song received generally positive reviews. Michael Saponara of Billboard ranked it as the sixth best track from Casino, calling it a "smooth yet seductive ride", while Steffanee Wang of The Fader considered it a standout song on the album, writing "It is supremely chill, laid back, nonchalant even, with its low-riding beat and sultry just-so keys. But something about the coolness is magnetic and it extends to the vocal delivery of all three of its main characters: Keem, Momo Boyd, and Kendrick Lamar. Their restraint makes the song's inquiries — Don't you love a good flirt with a stranger, Don't you love lettin' out a good cry, baby? — all the more steamy." Gabriel Bras Nevares deemed it an example of the rappers' "chemistry", writing "This one is a lot more low-key in comparison to something like 'Range Brothers,' though, especially due to Momo's beautiful performance on the track." He called Lamar's verse "charismatic" and added "Keem shines on the cut as well."

Pitchfork's Hattie Lindert described the song as displaying a "sweet, distinctly juvenile quality" and "so FM-radio-ready it would bring a tear to Berry Gordy's eye." She remarked that Momo Boyd "coolly inhabits her MC Lyte bag in the face of two exasperating musketeers" and Keem delivers a "warbly-to-the-max" refrain in a "cooed cadence that's equal parts Fabolous on 'Shawty Is Da Shit' and the Chainsmokers' 'Closer' (I wasn't kidding about the radio)." Lindert also stated "It's as if, worn out from the giddy romp of 'The Hillbillies,' Keem and Kendrick posted up back home, made sure their parents were asleep, and started talking about women, man." Robin Murray of Clash wrote the song "lives up to the billing, K Dot peppering the track with lyrical meteorites." Vibe's Jeff Ihaza commented that Lamar's verse "felt like another shockwave" and Momo Boyd "glides into Baby Keem's sonic universe like a cool gust of air, with a breezy hook that turns the song into a simmering slow burn."

Reviewing Casino for The Line of Best Fit, William Rosebury opined that "softer tracks" such as "Good Flirts" are a "weaker aspect of the album, but they offer an oasis of optimism in what is otherwise a heavy, soul-searching album." HotNewHipHop's Aron A. wrote that "Momo Boyd's seductive vocal presence complements Keem's R&B-influenced cadence while Kendrick's appearance functions less as a dominating verse and more as tonal seasoning, even with a humorous jab at Young Thug's jail call flubs." Oumar Saleh of NME regarded Lamar's appearance as "understated rather than dominant, reinforcing how much Keem has grown into his own voice. Their chemistry remains, but 'CA$INO' never feels like it's leaning on outside validation." In a more critical review of the album, Dylan Green of Pitchfork stated "Even his trademark chemistry with his big cousin falls through on 'Good Flirts'". Green also described the song as a "sleepy inverse" of "The Hillbillies" that "aims for playful romance but lands like an Activia ad in the middle of a Degrassi marathon."

In a ranking of every song on Casino, Taiyo Coates of RapTV placed the song fourth, describing Keem as "dipping into his R&B bag" and naming it a "perfectly fitting addition" to the PGLang catalog, writing that it "[carries] on where songs like 'Luther' leave off."

== Music video ==
The music video, directed by Renell Medrano, was released on March 5, 2026, after Baby Keem previewed it during his performance at Webster Hall in New York City on the previous day. The opening scene references a campaign mission from the video game Grand Theft Auto V, in which characters Lamar Davis and Franklin Clinton roast each other. The clip shows Keem with his lover in various settings, including an ice cream parlor, riding the bus, and eating at a Chinese restaurant. Kendrick Lamar wears an all-black outfit with a leather jacket. He appears in a barren church room with a hanging cross and drinking fountain, and later a basketball court. Some scenes were filmed at the New York Hall of Science.

== Charts ==
Chart performance for "Good Flirts"
Chart (2026)	Peak position
Australia Hip Hop/R&B (ARIA)	16
Canada Hot 100 (Billboard)	46
Global 200 (Billboard)	73
New Zealand Hot Singles (RMNZ)	3
South Africa Streaming (TOSAC)	15
US Billboard Hot 100	34
US Hot R&B/Hip-Hop Songs (Billboard)	8
US Rhythmic Airplay (Billboard)	1
