= Trademark USA =

Song by Baby Keem

from the album The Melodic Blue
- Released: September 10, 2021
- Recorded: 2019–2020
- Genre: Hip hop; R&B
- Length: 4:31
- Label: Columbia; pgLang
- Songwriters: Hykeem Carter, Jr.; Adam Feeney; Teo Halm; Rogét Chahayed; Ruchaun Akers, Jr.
- Producers: Scott Bridgeway; Frank Dukes; Baby Keem; Teo Halm; Rogét Chahayed

"Trademark USA" (stylized in all lowercase) is the first song on the album The Melodic Blue by Baby Keem. This song was released on September 10, 2021 and debuted at number 64 on Rolling Stone’s Top 100 Songs Chart.

== Background ==
In 2019, Baby Keem uploaded the music video to his song Orange Soda to YouTube, and in one of the scenes there was a sentence reading “LLC The Dead” which is Trademark USA’s first known title. In 2020, Keem joined the 2020 XXL Freshman and performed the first verse of the song on the Freshman List. Months later, pgLang uploaded a video to their channel which featured a snippet of Keem rapping the second verse of Trademark USA.

In 2021, Keem went live on Instagram and previewed the song and while the song was playing, he reportedly said "Yo! This shit hard!" during the preview.

== Charts ==
"Trademark USA" debuted at number 64 on Rolling Stone's Top 100 Songs Chart.

== In popular culture ==
"Trademark USA" was one of the songs curated on Euphoria, an American television series on HBO. The song is used in the episode "You Who Cannot See, Think of Those Who Can".

== Certifications ==
Certifications and sales for "Trademark USA"
Region	Certification	Certified units/sales
New Zealand (RMNZ)	Gold	15,000^{‡}
^{‡} Sales+streaming figures based on certification alone.
