= Scott Bridgeway =

American songwriter, producer

- Born: Ruchaun Maurice Akers Jr. Roanoke, Virginia, U.S.
- Genres: Hip-hop; R&B; soul
- Occupations: Songwriter; record producer; drummer
- Publisher: Universal Music Publishing Group

Ruchaun Maurice Akers Jr., better known by his stage name Scott Bridgeway, is an American songwriter and record producer. He is known for his contributions to Kendrick Lamar album GNX (2024), co-writing Baby Keem's 2021 single "Family Ties", and Kanye West's album Donda 2 (2022). He is currently signed to Universal Music Publishing Group.

== Career ==
=== Musical beginnings ===
Akers grew up in Roanoke, Virginia, but moved with his mother to North Carolina when he was nine and began constructing his own beats and samples on computer software and drum machines during middle school. His break came when he was playing Call of Duty with a group of players he didn't know during COVID-19 while his music played in the background: one of the other players was producer Cardo Got Wings, who sent a comment that he loved the beats playing in the background. Several months later, Cardo Got Wings sent some ideas for Baby Keem, and wanted Akers to create some productions, which were accepted, resulting in inclusion on Baby Keem debut album The Melodic Blue.

=== GNX ===
In 2024, Akers contributed to Kendrick Lamar's studio album GNX, writing and/or producing "Luther", "Squabble Up", and "Peekaboo". For the week of May 17, 2025, Akers peaked in the Top 10 of the Billboard R&B/Hip-Hop Producers, R&B/Hip-Hop Songwriters, Rap Songwriters, and Rap Producers charts, while reaching the Top 25 on the Billboard Hot 100 Producers list.

== Selected songwriting & production credits ==
Title	Year	Artist	Album
"Sons & Critics Freestyle"	2020	Baby Keem	Non-album single
"Trademark USA"	2021	Baby Keem	The Melodic Blue
"Range Brothers" (with Kendrick Lamar)	2021	Baby Keem	The Melodic Blue
"Lost Souls" (solo or with Brent Faiyaz)	2021	Baby Keem	The Melodic Blue
"Cocoa" (with Don Toliver)	2021	Baby Keem	The Melodic Blue
"Scars"	2021	Baby Keem	The Melodic Blue
"Vent"	2021	Baby Keem	The Melodic Blue
"A Life of Pain"	2021	Baby Keem	The Melodic Blue
"Killstreaks" (with Don Toliver & PinkPantheress)	2021	Baby Keem	The Melodic Blue
"Highway 95"	2021	Baby Keem	The Melodic Blue
"Bank Account" (with Lil Uzi Vert)	2021	Baby Keem	The Melodic Blue
"We Did It Kid"	2022	Kanye West	Donda 2
"54321"	2022	Offset	Non-album single
"Fallin 4 U"	2023	Chlöe	In Pieces
"Squabble Up"	2024	Kendrick Lamar	GNX
"Luther" (with SZA)	2024	Kendrick Lamar	GNX
"Peekaboo" (featuring AzChike)	2024	Kendrick Lamar	GNX
"Take Off Your Dress"	2024	¥$	Vultures 2
"Done With You"	2024	Omar Apollo	God Said No
"Like This"	2024	Sugarhill Ddot	2 Sides of the Story
"No Security"	2026	Baby Keem	Casino
"Casino"	2026	Baby Keem	Casino
"House Money"	2026	Baby Keem	Casino
"Sex Appeal" (featuring Too Short)	2026	Baby Keem	Casino
"Highway 95 Pt. 2"	2026	Baby Keem	Casino
"Circus Circus Freestyle"	2026	Baby Keem	Casino
"No Blame"	2026	Baby Keem	Casino
"Tubi" (featuring Che Ecru)	2026	Baby Keem	Casino
"So Good" (featuring Kendrick Lamar)	2026	Jhené Aiko	Westside Whimsy
"Don't Leave"	2026	Halle Bailey	Love?... or Something Like It (Deluxe)
"Way Out"	2026	Halle Bailey	Love?... or Something Like It (Deluxe)

== Awards and nominations ==
Year	Ceremony	Award	Result	Ref
2026	68th Annual Grammy Awards	Record of The Year ("Luther")	Won	
2026	68th Annual Grammy Awards	Album of the Year (GNX)	Nominated	
2026	68th Annual Grammy Awards	Song of the Year ("Luther")	Nominated	
