= Casino (song) =

2026 song by Baby Keem

Song by Baby Keem

from the album Casino
- Released: February 20, 2026
- Genre: Hip-hop; trap
- Length: 4:20
- Label: PGLang; Columbia
- Songwriters: Hykeem Carter; Ruchaun Akers; Ronald LaTour; Teo Halm; Dominik Patrzek
- Producers: Baby Keem; Scott Bridgeway; Cardo; Halm; Deats

"Casino" is a song by American rapper Baby Keem, released on February 20, 2026 from his second studio album of the same name. It was produced by Keem himself, Scott Bridgeway, Cardo, Teo Halm and Deats.

== Composition ==
The song consists of 808s, synthesizers, choir tones and "club-ready" percussion. The beat also incorporates "8-bit motifs" and alarm and slot machine sounds, to evoke a casino-like atmosphere, along with a heavy bass. Lyrically, Baby Keem raps about how his financial success has not resolved personal troubles from his past. He details his trauma, such as his parents' lack of support (which he admits has made his struggles more difficult) and losing his grandmother.

== Critical reception ==
The song received generally positive reviews. Michael Saponara of Billboard ranked it as the third best track from Casino, noting "There's a maturity here we haven't heard in the past from Keem, as he wears his emotions on his sleeve." Antonio Johri of Complex regarded the song as a "perfect example" of the album's "nice balance between nostalgic, soul-sampling East Coast-inspired production and beats that are more forward-thinking and progressive", describing it as "an off-kilter sound with weird 808 hits and cycling, droning synths." Dylan Green of Pitchfork wrote, "The only thing preventing Keem from drowning on the title track is his athletic flows, which keep pace with Cardo's frenetic production without ever making a case for themselves."

== Charts ==
Chart performance for "Casino"
Chart (2026)	Peak position
Canada (Canadian Hot 100)	48
Global 200 (Billboard)	86
New Zealand Hot Singles (RMNZ)	4
South Africa Streaming (TOSAC)	36
US Billboard Hot 100	37
US Hot R&B/Hip-Hop Songs (Billboard)	10
