= House Money =

2026 song by Baby Keem

Song by Baby Keem

from the album Casino
- Released: February 20, 2026
- Genre: Hip-hop
- Length: 3:15
- Label: PGLang; Columbia
- Songwriters: Hykeem Carter; Kendrick Duckworth; Evan Hood; Ruchaun Akers; Teo Halm; Floyd Hills; Mark Williams; Raul Cubina; Philip Mueller; Philippe Renaux; Steve Wightman
- Producers: Baby Keem; Scott Bridgeway; Halm; Danja

"House Money" is a song by American rapper Baby Keem from his second studio album, Casino (2026). It features additional vocals from American rappers Kendrick Lamar and Denzel Curry. Produced by Keem himself, Scott Bridgeway, Teo Halm and Danja, the song contains a sample of "You Know the Feelin'" by Steve Wightman.

== Content ==
In the song, Baby Keem details the effects of his turbulent childhood—including his mother leaving him at the "stash house"—which he notes has contributed to his indifference toward obstacles in his life. He also conveys confidence rooted in his recognition of his own achievements rather than material wealth ("He put his name on his chain, what the fuck he got a name for? / Niggas know my name, what the fuck I need the chain for?"). Kendrick Lamar performs a melodic chorus, while Denzel Curry provides ad-libs throughout the song.

== Critical reception ==
The song received generally positive reviews. Michael Saponara of Billboard ranked it as the best track from Casino, writing that Baby Keem is "setting his foundation as a dynamic producer before rapping is apparent — a la Kanye West — with another sinister beatmaking blockbuster display." In regard to Kendrick Lamar's feature, Gabriel Bras Nevares of HotNewHipHop commented "His melodic drawl won't captivate every listener out there, especially thanks to the sing-songy chorus. But his cousin Keem makes it fit well on the song, and he comes through with a great lyrical performance." HotNewHipHop's Aron A. stated the song "trades blockbuster energy for chemistry. The production remains high-octane, but the track feels less like a cultural event and more like confirmation that their artistic dialogue operates comfortably across eras." Reviewing the album for NME, Oumar Saleh considered the song's "cocky swagger" as one of the moments that "stop the album from becoming overly heavy, reminding listeners that Keem's unpredictability is still part of the appeal."

== Charts ==
Chart performance for "House Money"
Chart (2026)	Peak position
Canada (Canadian Hot 100)	53
Global 200 (Billboard)	128
New Zealand Hot Singles (RMNZ)	6
South Africa Streaming (TOSAC)	31
US Billboard Hot 100	47
US Hot R&B/Hip-Hop Songs (Billboard)	12
