= Casino (Baby Keem album) =

2026 studio album by Baby Keem

Studio album by Baby Keem
- Released: February 20, 2026
- Genres: Alternative hip-hop; trap; pop rap
- Length: 37:00
- Labels: PGLang; Columbia
- Producers: Baby Keem; Beach Noise; Cardo; Danja; Deats; FnZ; Jahaan Sweet; Keanu Beats; Michael Uzowuru; Ojivolta; Rascal; Sean Momberger; Scott Bridgeway; Sounwave; Teo Halm; Whatssarp; Yara Shahidi

Baby Keem chronology
The Melodic Blue (2021)	Casino (2026)

Singles from Casino
- 1. "Good Flirts" Released: March 6, 2026

Casino (stylized as Ca$ino) is the second studio album by American rapper and record producer Baby Keem. It was released through PGLang and Columbia Records on February 20, 2026. It serves as the long-awaited follow-up to his debut studio album, The Melodic Blue (2021).

The album features guest appearances from fellow American rappers Kendrick Lamar and Too Short; as well as additional guest vocals from American singer-songwriters Momo Boyd and Che Ecru, while Bekon, Citizen Cope, Denzel Curry, and Mamii, provided additional contributions. Production on the album was primarily handled by Keem himself, alongside other record producers such as Cardo, Danja, Ojivolta, Scott Bridgeway, Sounwave, Teo Halm, and Yara Shahidi, among others.

The album was supported by one single, "Good Flirts" (featuring Lamar and Boyd), which was serviced to US rhythmic contemporary radio on March 6, 2026. Following the album’s release, Keem embarked on the Casino Tour across the US and Europe from April to September 2026.

== Background ==
After previously revealed the album's initial announcement in 2022, Baby Keem guest performed a song, "Family Ties" (along with his cousin and fellow American rapper Kendrick Lamar) on his second concert of the Grand National Tour—in support to the release of GNX (2024)—at the MetLife Stadium in East Rutherford, New Jersey on May 9, 2025. In January 2026, Keem was announced as a headliner for the June 5th opening date of the multi-day Governors Ball Music Festival in New York City, being held at Flushing Meadows–Corona Park for the fourth consecutive year.

On February 10, Keem announced the release via Instagram, revealing the album cover artwork and announcing the availability of a limited edition vinyl release. He also announced that the tour, called Casino Tour, will start on April 15. Casino marked as Keem's return after almost five years, following his debut studio album, The Melodic Blue (2021). Rolling Out described the time between the release of the two albums as "an eternity in modern hip-hop", considering this extended interval "a double-edged sword" for the rapper, between fan anticipation and skepticism about his return to the music scene. During throughout his absence, Keem has been teasing some new music with him mentioning about releasing a new album, titled Child with Wolves. The tracklist revealed that the album would contain 12 songs, with Lamar featured on a track, titled "Good Flirts".

== Artwork ==
The album cover artwork is a photo of Keem as a baby, with Hypebeast interpreted this choice as "potentially pointing to a deeply personal and introspective audiovisual endeavor" that explores different themes and subjects from the previous album, writing that the themes of vulnerability and introspection are present in the associated YouTube teaser. The aesthetic of Casino echoes the vintage vibe of Las Vegas, Nevada and with Keem's social media profile having been redesigned to match this style.

== Release and promotion ==
To accompanying with the album announcement, Keem shared a short documentary, Booman I, on YouTube. Keem is shown in the studio with his family, including his cousin Kendrick Lamar. The video was directed by Alexandre Moors and LaConnie Govan, and it was co-produced by Lamar, Dave Free, and the duo's label— PGLang—alongside with Eerie Times, in association with Good Company. The second short documentary, Booman II, was released via YouTube on February 16, four days before the album's release. The third and final short documentary, Booman III, was released via YouTube on February 19, a day before the album's release.

On February 19, just hours before the album's release, Keem held a listening party—from which where the album was played to its entirety—at The Lot at Formosa in West Hollywood, California. He also performed some of the tracks live, with surprise guest appearances by Momo Boyd, Too Short, Desmond Johnson from RDCWorld (who was portrayed as a mime), and Che Ecru. The event was directed by Mike Carson.

=== Singles ===
The music video for a song, "Good Flirts", directed by Renell Medrano, was released on March 5.

=== Other songs ===
The music video for a song, "Birds & the Bees", shot in Las Vegas, was directed by Jack Begert and was released on February 23. It stars Keem, alongside the mime portrayed by Johnson, and Lara Raj from Katseye (who was portrayed as Keem's love interest).

== Critical reception ==
Professional ratings
Aggregate scores
Source	Rating
Metacritic	74/100
Review scores
Source	Rating
Clash	8/10
The Line of Best Fit	7/10
NME	4/5 stars
Pitchfork	5.5/10
Rolling Stone	3.5/5 stars

Upon its release, Casino received generally positive reviews. At Metacritic, which assigns a normalized rating out of 100 to reviews from professional publications, the album received a weighted average score of 74, based on eight reviews, indicating "generally favorable reviews". Clash gave the album a positive review, praising its themes and Keem's authenticity and writing, "It's a staunchly creative gesture, defying the pressure of the outside world for a project which thrives on internal desires, and the power of autobiography at any cost." NME's Oumar Saleh wrote, "It's a confident, cohesive return that sounds like Keem has stopped trying to prove he belongs, and started figuring out what he wants to say now that he's here". Pitchfork was more mixed toward the album, with an editor score of 5.5 out of 10 and a reader score of 6.3 out of 10. Writing for the publication, Dylan Green described the album's lyrics as "the most reflective Keem's ever been", although he wrote that Keem's "warring pop star and rapper sensibilities" ultimately resulted in a "garbled tonal mess."

== Track listing ==
Casino track listing
No.	Title	Writer(s)	Producer(s)	Length
1.	"No Security"	Hykeem Carter; Martin McKinney^{[a]}; Ruchaun Akers; Michael Mulé; Isaac De Boni; Floyd Hills; Elliot Bergman^{[a]}; Natalie Bergman^{[a]}	Baby Keem; Scott Bridgeway; FnZ; Danja	1:58
2.	"Casino"	Carter; Akers; Ronald LaTour; Teo Halm; Dominik Patrzek	Keem; Bridgeway; Cardo; Halm; Deats	4:20
3.	"Birds & the Bees"	Carter; Evan Hood; Hills; Yara Shahidi; Leslie Feist^{[b]}	Keem; Danja; Shahidi	2:16
4.	"Good Flirts" (featuring Kendrick Lamar and Momo Boyd)	Carter; Kendrick Duckworth; Kayla Le; Cydel Young; Halm; Tobias Breuer; Teddy Sarpong; Burt Bacharach^{[d]}; Hal David^{[d]}; Lonnie Lynn^{[d]}; James Yancey^{[d]}; Bobby Caldwell^{[d]}; Bruce Malament^{[d]}; Norman Harris^{[d]}	Keem; Halm; Rascal; Whatssarp	3:52
5.	"House Money"	Carter; Duckworth; Hood; Akers; Halm; Hills; Mark Williams; Raul Cubina; Philip Mueller; Philippe Renaux; Steve Wightman^{[e]}	Keem; Bridgeway; Halm; Danja	3:15
6.	"I Am Not a Lyricist"	Carter; Clarence Greenwood; Young; Jahaan Sweet; Breuer; Giorgos Hatzinasios; Giannis Kalamitsis	Keem; Sweet; Rascal	3:25
7.	"Sex Appeal" (featuring Too Short)	Carter; Todd Shaw; Hood; Akers; Williams; Cubina; Halm; Hills; Sweet; Michael Uzowuru; Bill Withers^{[f]}	Keem; Bridgeway; Ojivolta; Halm; Danja; Sweet; Uzowuru	3:04
8.	"Highway 95 Pt. 2"	Carter; Akers; Williams; Cubina; Billy Stewart^{[g]}	Keem; Bridgeway; Ojivolta	3:48
9.	"Circus Circus Freestyle"	Carter; Daniel Tannenbaum; Akers; Halm; Hills; Sean Momberger; Don Banks	Keem; Bridgeway; Halm; Danja; Momberger; Shahidi	4:52
10.	"Dramatic Girl" (featuring Che Ecru)	Carter; Michee Lebrun; Samuel Dew; Williams; Cubina; Mark Spears; Matthew Schaeffer; Johnny Kosich; Jake Kosich; Keanu Torres; Nickolas Peristeridis; Steve Lacy	Keem; Ojivolta; Sounwave; Beach Noise; Keanu Beats; Argos^{[c]}	3:19
11.	"No Blame"	Carter; Young; Akers; Williams; Cubina; Hills; James Litherland^{[h]}	Keem; Bridgeway; Ojivolta; Danja	2:46
Total length:				37:00

Physical release
No.	Title	Writer(s)	Producer(s)	Length
8.	"Tubi" (featuring Che Ecru)	Carter; Lebrun; Akers; Spears	Keem; Bridgeway; Sounwave

=== Notes ===
- Sex Appeal is stylized as $ex Appeal
- Circus Circus Freestyle is stylized as Circus Circus Free$tyle
- I Am Not a Lyricist is stylized as I am not a Lyricist
- ^{^[c]} signifies a co-producer.

==== Sample and interpolation credits ====
- ^{^[a]} "No Security" contains a sample of "You Can Have Me", written by Natalie Bergman and Martin McKinney, as performed by Bergman.
- ^{^[b]} "Birds & the Bees" contains a sample of "Honey Honey", written and performed by Feist.
- ^{^[d]} "Good Flirts" contains an interpolation of "The Light", written by Lonnie Lynn, James Yancey, Bobby Caldwell, Ramel Werner, Norman Harris, and Bruce Malament, and performed by Common, and a sample of "Walk on By", written by Burt Bacharach and Hal David, as performed by the Undisputed Truth.
- ^{^[e]} "House Money" contains a sample of "You Know the Feelin'", written and performed by Steve Wightman.
- ^{^[f]} "Sex Appeal" contains a sample of "Make a Smile for Me", written and performed by Bill Withers.
- ^{^[g]} "Highway 95 Pt. 2" contains a sample of "I Do Love You", written by Billy Stewart, as performed by GQ.
- ^{^[h]} "No Blame" contains a sample of "I Never Learnt to Share", written and performed by James Blake.

== Personnel ==
Credits adapted from Tidal.

- Baby Keem – vocals
- Gavin Finn – engineering (tracks 1, 2, 5, 9, 10, 11)
- James Hunt – engineering (3, 4, 6–8)
- Ray Charles Brown Jr. – engineering (4)
- S. Blake Kanicka – engineering (4)
- Johnathan Turner – engineering (5), engineering assistance (1, 2, 9, 10, 11)
- Oli Jacobs – mixing
- Cam Gilfro – mixing assistance
- Ruairi O'Flaherty – mastering
- Zach Brown – bass (1, 10)
- Shawna Higginson Peters – background vocals (4)
- Denzel Curry – background vocals (5)
- Kendrick Lamar – background vocals (5)
- Citizen Cope – background vocals (6)
- Bekon – background vocals (9)
- Mamii – background vocals (10)
- Peter Halm – additional vocals (2)
- Teo Halm – additional vocals (2)

== Charts ==
Chart performance for Casino
Chart (2026)	Peak position
Australian Albums (ARIA)	13
Australian Hip Hop/R&B Albums (ARIA)	1
Austrian Albums (Ö3 Austria)	9
Belgian Albums (Ultratop Flanders)	31
Belgian Albums (Ultratop Wallonia)	101
Canadian Albums (Billboard)	8
Danish Albums (Hitlisten)	14
Dutch Albums (Album Top 100)	20
French Albums (SNEP)	109
German Albums (Offizielle Top 100)	28
German Hip-Hop Albums (Offizielle Top 100)	4
Irish Albums (Official Charts)	24
Lithuanian Albums (AGATA)	10
New Zealand Albums (RMNZ)	6
Norwegian Albums (VG-lista)	25
Polish Albums (ZPAV)	53
Portuguese Albums (AFP)	4
Scottish Albums (Official Charts)	12
Spanish Albums (Promusicae)	95
Swedish Albums (Sverigetopplistan)	27
Swiss Albums (Schweizer Hitparade)	6
Swiss Hip-Hop Albums (Schweizer Hitparade)	2
UK Albums (Official Charts)	29
UK R&B Albums (Official Charts)	1
US Billboard 200	4
US Top R&B/Hip-Hop Albums (Billboard)	1

== Release history ==
Release history for Casino
Region	Date	Label(s)	Format(s)	Edition	Ref.
Various	February 20, 2026	PGLang; Columbia	Digital download; streaming	Standard	
Various	February 20, 2026	PGLang; Columbia	LP	Standard	
Various	February 20, 2026	PGLang; Columbia	CD	Standard	
