= Leavemealone =

Single by Fred Again and Baby Keem

from the album USB
- Released: 8 December 2023
- Genre: Drum and bass
- Length: 3:42
- Label: Atlantic UK
- Songwriters: Fred Again; Kevin Grady; Mark Spears; Daniel Tannenbaum; Ed Phillips; Matt Schaefer; Dacoury Natche; Shirleen Aubert; Sabrina Benaim; Dominic Patrzek; Hykeem Carter, Jr.; Johnny Kosich, Jr.
- Producers: Fred Again; Loose; Kieran Hebden; Alex Gibson; Skrillex; Boo; Sid Stone

Fred Again singles chronology
"Ten" (2023)	"Leavemealone" (2023)	"Stayinit" (2024)

Baby Keem singles chronology
"The Hillbillies" (2023)	"Leavemealone" (2023)

Music video
- "Leavemealone" on YouTube

"Leavemealone" is a song by English DJ and producer Fred Again and American rapper Baby Keem. It was released on 8 December 2023 by Atlantic Records UK, and included on Fred Again's compilation album, USB.

"Leavemealone" was nominated for Best Dance/Electronic Recording at the 67th Annual Grammy Awards.

== Composition ==
"Leavemealone" is written in the key of A minor with a tempo of 87 beats per minute. Baby Keem's rap vocals are samples of two of his own songs: "Bullies" from his 2019 mixtape Die for My Bitch, and "South Africa" from his 2021 album The Melodic Blue. Fred Again chopped up, repitched and remodeled the vocals using the music sampling service Tracklib. Keem's flow switches in tandem with each production change.

== Critical reception ==
In his review for Billboard, Jason Lipshutz wrote that Fred Again streamlined the Baby Keem samples and made them sound "wholly original". Robin Murray of Clash said the song "brings some fire to midwinter".

== Chart performance ==
In December 2023, "Leavemealone" debuted at number 30 on the UK Singles Chart with first-week sales of 18,178 track-equivalent units. Following a decline in popularity of Christmas music in January 2024, "Leavemealone" climbed from number 75 to a new peak of number 11 with sales of 15,210 units. It spent 18 weeks on the chart and was certified platinum by the British Phonographic Industry (BPI) for sales of 600,000 units. On the UK Dance Chart, the song entered at number two, behind Cassö, Raye and D-Block Europe's "Prada".

== Track listing ==
Digital download and streaming

1. "Leavemealone" – 3:42

Digital download and streaming – Nia Archives remix

1. "Leavemealone" (Nia Archives remix) – 2:59
2. "Leavemealone" – 3:42

== Charts ==
=== Weekly charts ===
Weekly chart performance for "Leavemealone"
Chart (2023–2024)	Peak position
Australia (ARIA)	13
Australia Dance (ARIA)	2
Austria (Ö3 Austria Top 40)	57
Ireland (IRMA)	21
Lithuania (AGATA)	51
New Zealand (Recorded Music NZ)	4
Slovakia Singles Digital (ČNS IFPI)	31
UK Singles (OCC)	11
UK Dance (OCC)	2
US Hot Dance/Electronic Songs (Billboard)	6

=== Year-end charts ===
Year-end chart performance for "Leavemealone"
Chart (2024)	Position
Australia (ARIA)	73
Australia Dance (ARIA)	6
New Zealand (Recorded Music NZ)	27
UK Singles (OCC)	96
US Hot Dance/Electronic Songs (Billboard)	52

== Certifications ==
Certifications for "Leavemealone"
Region	Certification	Certified units/sales
Australia (ARIA)	Platinum	70,000^{‡}
Belgium (BRMA)	Gold	20,000^{‡}
Canada (Music Canada)	Gold	40,000^{‡}
New Zealand (RMNZ)	3× Platinum	90,000^{‡}
United Kingdom (BPI)	Platinum	600,000^{‡}
^{‡} Sales+streaming figures based on certification alone.
