= Birds & the Bees =

2026 song by Baby Keem

Song by Baby Keem

from the album Casino
- Released: February 20, 2026
- Genre: Hip-hop
- Length: 2:16
- Label: PGLang; Columbia
- Songwriters: Hykeem Carter; Evan Hood; Floyd Hills; Yara Shahidi; Leslie Feist
- Producers: Baby Keem; Danja; Shahidi

Music video
- "Birds & the Bees" on YouTube

"Birds & the Bees" is a song by American rapper Baby Keem from his second studio album, Casino (2026). Produced by Keem himself, Danja and Yara Shahidi, the song samples "Honey Honey" by Feist.

== Composition ==
The song contains a pitched-up sample of "Honey Honey" and "punchy drums". It finds Baby Keem in a nostalgic mood, as he envisions his relationship with his lover. In the chorus, Keem employs a riddle-like rhyme scheme based on the days of the week. He suggests that his sexual relations feel more rewarding following his rise to success.

== Critical reception ==
The song received generally positive reviews. Michael Saponara of Billboard ranked it as the fourth best track from Casino, praising the chorus as an "earworm" and "sure to be echoing in your brain for weeks to come." Robin Murray of Clash described Baby Keem as "in his element" on the song. Antonio Johri of Complex remarked that Keem "expertly flips" "Honey Honey", "making for something bouncy but light-footed, with vocals and melodies that are straight ear candy."

== Music video ==
The music video was released on February 23, 2026. It was directed by Jack Begert, who also wrote it with Dave Free. The clip stars singer Lara Raj from the group Katseye as the character Anna, Baby Keem's love interest, and features a cameo from content creator Desmond Johnson (from RDCWorld) as a mime. Keem is depicted to be in a toxic relationship with Anna. After growing frustrated with her taking a long time to dress up, they head off for a night out. When Anna complains about going out with him very often, Keem mumbles that he should have spent time with Jade, another woman he is implied to be involved with, instead. His comment causes Anna to punch him, leaving him with a bloody nose, before storming out. Keem later hangs out with friends and learns that Anna is rumored to have "two kings". Upon checking his phone and bank account, he discovers that Anna has scammed him by draining his funds. Keem pursues her by car, but she escapes on a private jet before he can catch her.

== Charts ==
Chart performance for "Birds & the Bees"
Chart (2026)	Peak position
Canada Hot 100 (Billboard)	62
Global 200 (Billboard)	175
New Zealand Hot Singles (RMNZ)	7
South Africa Streaming (TOSAC)	48
US Billboard Hot 100	50
US Hot R&B/Hip-Hop Songs (Billboard)	14
