= Durag Activity =

2021 single by Baby Keem and Travis Scott

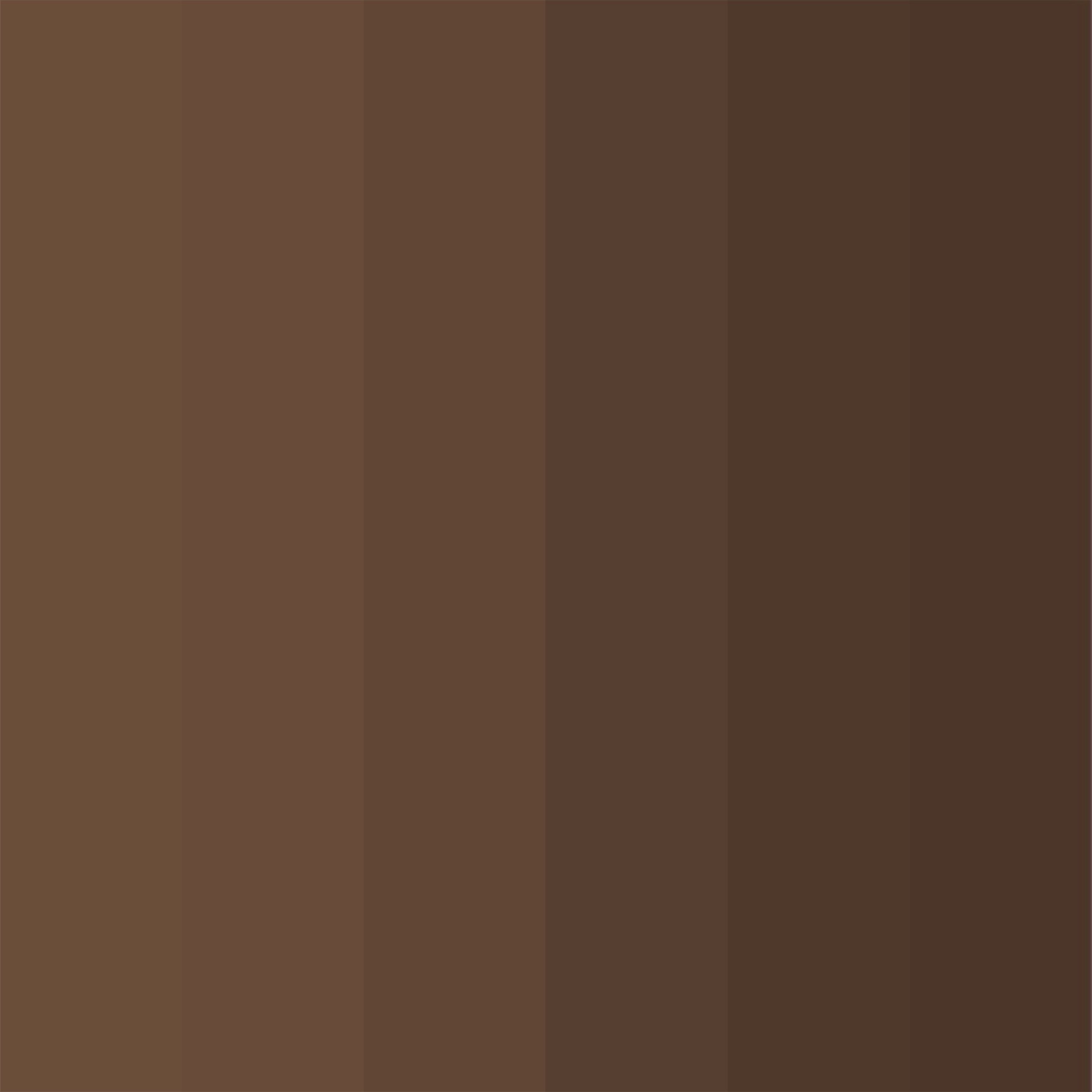

Single by Baby Keem and Travis Scott

from the album The Melodic Blue
- Released: April 30, 2021
- Recorded: 2020
- Genre: Alternative hip-hop; trap
- Length: 3:45
- Label: PGLang; Columbia
- Songwriters: Hykeem Carter; Jacques Webster; Justin Howze
- Producer: Brick!

Baby Keem singles chronology
"No Sense" (2021)	"Durag Activity" (2021)	"Family Ties" (2021)

Travis Scott singles chronology
"Buss It" (Remix) (2021)	"Durag Activity" (2021)	"Flocky Flocky" (2021)

Music video
- "Durag Activity" on YouTube

"Durag Activity" is a song by American rappers Baby Keem and Travis Scott. It was released through Columbia Records and PGLang as the lead single from Keem's debut studio album, The Melodic Blue, on April 30, 2021. Released on Scott's 30th birthday, he and Keem wrote the song with producer Justin "Brick!" Howze. A durag is a close-fitting cloth tied around the top of the head to protect the hair.

== Background ==
The song was announced by Baby Keem on April 21, 2021, before it was released on Travis Scott’s birthday, April 30.

In May 2021, Madonna posted a photo of herself wearing a bandana with "durag activity" in the captions on Twitter. Keem responded with, "...Can I send you a Durag?" and then, "did I humble Madonna?"

== Composition ==
Wongo Okon of Uproxx describes the song as Baby Keem "leading the way with near-mumble raps" before Travis Scott "arrives with his trademark autotune croons". In the song, Baby Keem and Travis Scott talk about "money, influence, and women in their lives", which they describe as "durag activity", over a "clicking, slinking" beat. "Distorted piano chords" can also be heard in the instrumental.

== Critical reception ==
Sophie Caraan of Hypebeast writes, "The effortless delivery from both Keem and Scott provide a new layer of texture for the bars they drop — which are mostly about getting rich — and almost gives it a new meaning, putting emphasis on the importance fusion of flow, cadence and lyricism." Erika Marie of HotNewHipHop called the song "laid back" and "slow-burning".

== Music video ==
An accompanying music video was released on April 30, 2021. Directed by Eliel Ford, it depicts Baby Keem as a mob boss and opens with him in a suit, rapping his verse while someone in the background is beat up. After "laying hands on an enemy", Keem gets tied to a chair with Travis Scott, but they "reverse the situation".

== Charts ==
Chart (2021)	Peak position
Canada Hot 100 (Billboard)	53
Global 200 (Billboard)	77
Lithuania (AGATA)	67
New Zealand Hot Singles (RMNZ)	6
UK Singles (Official Charts)	96
US Billboard Hot 100	85
US Hot R&B/Hip-Hop Songs (Billboard)	38

== Certifications ==
Certifications for "Durag Activity"
Region	Certification	Certified units/sales
Canada (Music Canada)	Gold	40,000^{‡}
United States (RIAA)	Platinum	1,000,000^{‡}
^{‡} Sales+streaming figures based on certification alone.
