= Range Brothers =

2021 song by Baby Keem and Kendrick Lamar

Song by Baby Keem and Kendrick Lamar

from the album The Melodic Blue
- Released: September 10, 2021
- Recorded: 2020–2021
- Genre: Hip-hop
- Length: 5:17
- Label: Columbia; pgLang
- Songwriters: Hykeem Carter, Jr.; Kendrick Duckworth; Jahaan Sweet; Ruchaun Akers, Jr.; Dylan Cleary-Krell; Riccardo Polo; Eric Sloan; Samuel Gloade
- Producers: Baby Keem; 30 Roc; Scott Bridgeway; Dez Wright; Ricky Polo; Sloane; Jahaan Sweet

"Range Brothers" (stylized in all lowercase) is a song by American rappers Baby Keem and Kendrick Lamar. The song was released on September 10, 2021 by Columbia Records and pgLang as the fourth track off of the former's debut album, The Melodic Blue. "Range Brothers" made the Billboard Hot 100 and Hot R&B/Hip Hop songs charts among others. The third portion of the song's chorus by Lamar was leaked before the album's release and became a viral internet meme.

== Background ==
On September 8, 2021, two days before its official release, parts of the song were leaked.

Baby Keem and his cousin, Kendrick Lamar, address a variety of themes, including the financial prosperity that comes with fame, their difficult upbringings, sexual prowess, and betrayal.

== Composition and lyrics ==
The fourth track off of Baby Keem's debut album, "Range Brothers" sees Keem reunite with his cousin Kendrick Lamar. The two real-life cousins sing about their difficult beginnings, how they were fortunate to be in the position they are in today, and the costs of fame. At one point, Lamar warns Keem about fame, saying "Every day, the hate restored and the faith get short." Keem responds with: "Fuck that, let me get some too!"

"Range Brothers" is divided into three parts, each lasting around 1.5 minutes. Changes in beats, cadences, and styles represent shifts in the song's sections. A New York Times review commented that "Punchy drums feel offbeat with pauses punctuated by Keem's staccato delivery, and intertwined vocal and string samples construct a grandiose stage."

A controversial part of the song is Lamar's repetitive verse at the end of the track, where he raps, "Let's get this shit/ Let's get this shit/ Let's get this shit, Let's." He then repeatedly rhymes, "Top o' the morning/ Top o' the morning/ Top o' the morning/ Top o' the morning/ Top o' the morning/ Top o' the morning." Keem appeared to respond to the controversy in a tweet, saying "me and dot [Kendrick] created four new languages bro. rap was boring. so we start making new languages."

== Reception ==
The song was polarizing to audiences, featuring strong orchestral synths, but received generally favorable critic reviews, and was considered by some among the most complex and ambitious of all the tracks on The Melodic Blue. Kendrick Lamar's participation was noted by one critic as "bizarre and unconventional for a rapper of his status", but also potentially "innovating toward something new". His use of ad libs and repetitions of the phrases "Let's get this shit" and "top of the mornin'" became viral online and sparked internet memes. Vulture called the song Kendrick's first main new attraction in years, saying "Range Brothers finds Lamar trading bars with Keem about all the money and girls he doesn't know what to do with, along with contributing some playful vocals in the song."

== Charts ==
Chart performance for "Range Brothers"
| Chart (2021) | Peak position |
|---|---|
| Canada Hot 100 (Billboard) | 61 |
| Global 200 (Billboard) | 73 |
| US Hot Rap Songs (Billboard) | 20 |
| US Billboard Hot 100 | 53 |
| US Hot R&B/Hip-Hop Songs (Billboard) | 23 |

== Certifications ==
Certifications for "Range Brothers"
| Region | Certification | Certified units/sales |
|---|---|---|
| United States (RIAA) | Gold | 500,000^{‡} |
^{‡} Sales+streaming figures based on certification alone.
