= The Melodic Blue =

- Standard cover

Studio album by Baby Keem
- Released: September 10, 2021
- Recorded: 2019–2021
- Studios: Chalice (Hollywood); Shangri-La (Malibu); Stellar House (Venice); United (Hollywood); The Village (Santa Monica); Windmark (Santa Monica)
- Genres: West Coast hip-hop; trap
- Length: 53:44
- Labels: PGLang; Columbia
- Producers: Baby Keem; 30 Roc; Beach Noise; Bekon; Brick; Cardo; Che Ecru; Deats; DJ Dahi; Faxonly; FnZ; Frank Dukes; Frankie Bash; Grandmaster Vic; J. Lbs; Jahaan Sweet; Jake the Snake; Jasper Harris; Jeff Kleinman; John Bloom; Johnny Juliano; Johnny Kosich; Oogie Mane; Outtatown; Pilgrim; Rascal; Ricky Polo; Rogét Chahayed; Roselilah; Scott Bridgeway; Sloane; Soldado; Sounwave; Tae Beast; Teo Halm; Yung Exclusive

Baby Keem chronology
Die for My Bitch (2019)	The Melodic Blue (2021)	Casino (2026)

Singles from The Melodic Blue
- 1. "Hooligan" Released: September 18, 2020; 2. "No Sense" Released: March 5, 2021; 3. "Durag Activity" Released: April 30, 2021; 4. "Family Ties" Released: August 27, 2021

The Melodic Blue is the debut studio album by the American rapper and record producer Baby Keem. It was released on September 10, 2021, by PGLang and Columbia Records, with Keem serving as the executive producer. The standard version of the album features guest appearances by rappers Kendrick Lamar, Travis Scott, and Don Toliver. An updated version, released on September 22, features an additional guest appearance from singer Brent Faiyaz. The deluxe edition of The Melodic Blue, released on October 28, 2022, features additional guest appearances from PinkPantheress and Lil Uzi Vert.

The Melodic Blue was supported by four singles, including "Durag Activity" with Scott, and "Family Ties" with Lamar. "Durag Activity" peaked at number 85 on the Billboard Hot 100. "Family Ties" peaked at number 18 on the Hot 100 and won the Grammy Award for Best Rap Performance, marking Keem's first Grammy Award. The album received generally positive reviews from music critics, one of whom called it the album that ushered Keem into the spotlight. It debuted at number five on the Billboard 200, earning 53,000 total album-equivalent units in its first week. It charted internationally in more than a dozen countries. In 2023, the album was certified Platinum by the Recording Industry Association of America.

== Background ==
The Melodic Blue is Baby Keem's first studio album. Prior to the release, Keem had three mixtapes, a collaboration with Kanye West, and a myriad of production and songwriting credits. When asked how his producer background factored into his work, Keem said "I feel like producer artists are like the best artists, just because you just know what you want. You see a vision. You're able to execute a vision from start to finish — unwavered. That's probably the best thing I've ever learned, how to make beats." Keem shared that his inspiration largely comes from Mike Will Made It, Metro Boomin, and Kanye West, and said about West, "That’s one person I’ll never say anything ill about. He’s a legend. [Without Kanye] I wouldn’t even be sitting here, I wouldn’t have had the inspiration for this project." Keem considers West one of the few rappers who still pushes the envelope on what music can be. He also incorporated styles made popular by Brent Faiyaz and SZA. Keem was influenced by rhythm and blues songs of the 90s which can be seen in his drum patterns and emotional vocal performances. The album shows a progression in Keem's musical style where he explores new melodies and themes, showing a new side of Keem in bass production and piano additions.

On October 19, 2020, Baby Keem first teased the title of the album by adding its name and some of the tracks onto a hoodie, but confirmed the project's title on April 30, 2021. On August 31, 2021, Keem stated that he finished the album and said that it "has my best production / compositional work". Two days later, he confirmed that it would be released that month. On September 6, 2021, Labor Day, Keem confirmed the release date and revealed the cover art. Two days later, he revealed the tracklist.

The album is the first time Keem has had someone else featured in his songs, working alongside Kendrick Lamar and Travis Scott, the latter of whom Keem said was "really easy to work with".

== Recording and production ==
Before the album's release, Keem revealed that Travis Scott and Kendrick Lamar and would be featured on the project. The production of The Melodic Blue is characterized by washed-out synths, booming bass, and distorted beats. It is noted for featuring the first three collaborations between Keem and his cousin Kendrick Lamar, who plays the role of Keem's elder brother in the tracks he features on. They also marked the first new songs from Lamar since the release of Black Panther: The Album (2018), which Keem assisted with in production and songwriting. Some of Kendrick Lamar's lyrics from the song "Range Brothers" were leaked a day before the album's release and went viral as memes for their seemingly unusual content. Keem subsequently claimed that he and Lamar created four new languages together while recording the album. Keem was the main producer for the album. MixedbyAli, a sound engineer for the album, said Keem "produces the majority of all his records — he's super involved in every aspect of it." In an interview with Billboard, Keem said he took his time and was very careful recording the vocals for the album.

== Release and promotion ==
Before the album's release, Keem dropped the single "Family Ties", featuring Kendrick Lamar, which became a Grammy-winning hit. The song was praised for its trumpet intro and intense back-and-forth between Keem and Lamar, creating excitement for the rest of the album. In April 2021, Keem teamed up with Travis Scott and released the single "Durag Activity", which became a chart hit and was planned to be on the album.

The Melodic Blue was initially released in September 2021 and consisted of 16 tracks. On September 22, the album was updated to include three bonus tracks: the already released singles "No Sense" and "Hooligan", and a reworked version of "Lost Souls" featuring vocals from Brent Faiyaz.

Keem surprised fans with a deluxe edition of his album "The Melodic Blue" on October 28, 2022, more than a year after its original release date. The deluxe edition contained seven new songs, bringing the total number of tracks on the album to 23. In his song "Highway 95" from the deluxe version, Baby Keem incorporates a sample from the hit Fugees record "Killing Me Softly with His Song". On Twitter, Keem thanked Lauryn Hill, who was a member of the Fugees and holds the rights to the original composition.

To promote the album, Keem embarked on The Melodic Blue Tour, visiting cities across North America and Europe from November 2021 to July 2022. Keem also performed at major festivals such as Rolling Loud, Day 'N' Vegas, and Coachella. He had his first television appearance when he promoted the album on Jimmy Kimmel Live!.

== Commercial reception ==
The album debuted at number five on the US Billboard 200, selling 53,000 copies in its first week. The Melodic Blue saw 70.1 million on-demand streams in its first week, making it the second-most streamed album of that week, only behind Drake's Certified Lover Boy. By the second week, the album had 305.4 million on-demand streams. His single "Family Ties" peaked at number 18 on the Billboard Hot 100 and received the Grammy Award for Best Rap Performance, his first Grammy.

On April 13, 2022, the album was certified Gold by the Recording Industry Association of America (RIAA), for combined sales and album-equivalent units over 500,000 units in the United States. By August 2023, the album had reached Platinum certification for combined sales of over one million. The album also charted internationally, peaking at number 49 on the UK Albums Chart, number five on the Canadian Albums Chart, and number nine on the Norwegian Albums Chart.

== Critical reception ==
The Melodic Blue ratings
Aggregate scores
Source	Rating
Metacritic	77/100
Review scores
Source	Rating
AllMusic	3/5 stars
Clash	7/10
Earmilk	4/5 stars
The Guardian	5/5 stars
HipHopDX	3.6/5
The Line of Best Fit	6/10
MusicOMH	3.5/5 stars
NME	4/5 stars
Pitchfork	6.4/10
Rolling Stone	3.5/5 stars

The Melodic Blue received generally positive reviews from music critics. At Metacritic, which assigns a rating out of 100 to reviews from professional publications, the album received a weighted average score of 77, based on 11 reviews, indicating "generally favorable reviews".

In a five-star review, Ben Beaumont-Thomas of The Guardian called The Melodic Blue the best rap album of 2021 and praised Keem's "gift for vocal melody that promises so much to come." Will Dukes of Rolling Stone found Baby Keem to be "sharp, focused and easy to like." Luke Britton of NME called Keem a "rising star" who "shows his versatility and wide-ranging sound on confident, [sic] mostly self-produced project." Tomas Miriti Pacheo of Spin described the album as "charismatic and hilarious" at times, and praised Keem's production that was "often as bold as his lyrics." He highlighted, however, that some of the production, most notably on "South Africa" and "Gorgeous" felt oversaturated and had Keem sounding "imitative at best and grating at worst."

In a lukewarm review, Dylan Green of Pitchfork wrote that while the album is more intimate than Keem's past work, containing reminiscence on his childhood such as trips to Popeyes in his Mom's coupe, it is by no means a confessional. He went on to say that Keem "uses the opportunity to expand his well-established fascination with trap and melody to feature-length—with mixed results." He considers it the album that moved Keem into the spotlight, and lauded his verse on "Family Ties", suggesting it was among the best tracks of his career as he confidently rapped "over horns and thudding 808s with a handful of flows".

Complex ranked The Melodic Blue as the 13th best album of 2021, calling it one of the most ambitious and risky projects that has come out in years. They stated that it is "overflowing with ideas. If you don't like what you hear at any given moment, just wait a few seconds and the beat will switch or Keem will try a new flow."

== Track listing ==
The Melodic Blue track listing
No.	Title	Writer(s)	Producer(s)	Length
1.	"Trademark USA"	Hykeem Carter, Jr.; Adam Feeney; Rogét Chahayed; Teo Halm; Ruchaun Akers, Jr.	Baby Keem; Frank Dukes; Chahayed; Halm; Scott Bridgeway	4:30
2.	"Pink Panties"	Carter; Michee Lebrun	Baby Keem; Che Ecru	2:43
3.	"Scapegoats"	Carter; Dacoury Natche; Michael Mulé; Isaac De Boni; Lindsay Olsen^{[b]}; Josiah Wise^{[b]}; Gueorgui Linev^{[b]}	Baby Keem; DJ Dahi; FnZ; Beach Noise^{[a]}	1:16
4.	"Range Brothers" (with Kendrick Lamar)	Carter; Kendrick Duckworth; Samuel Gloade; Jahaan Sweet; Akers; Dylan Cleary-Krell; Riccardo Polo; Eric Sloan	Baby Keem; 30 Roc; Sweet; Bridgeway; Dez Wright; Ricky Polo; Sloane	5:16
5.	"Issues"	Carter; Sweet	Baby Keem; Sweet	3:39
6.	"Gorgeous"	Carter; Sweet; Ronald LaTour; John E. Julian; Daveon Jackson	Baby Keem; Sweet; Cardo; Johnny Juliano; Yung Exclusive	2:20
7.	"South Africa"	Carter; Daniel Tannenbaum	Baby Keem; Bekon	2:54
8.	"Lost Souls"	Carter; Sweet; Akers; Lebrun	Baby Keem; Sweet; Bridgeway; Jake the Snake; Che Ecru; Beach Noise	4:29
9.	"Cocoa" (with Don Toliver)	Carter; Caleb Toliver; Sweet; Akers	Baby Keem; Sweet; Bridgeway	3:49
10.	"Family Ties" (with Kendrick Lamar)	Carter; Duckworth; LaTour; Tobias Dekker; Roshwita Bacha; Dominik Patrzek; Jasper Harris; Colin Franken	Baby Keem; Cardo; Outtatown; Roselilah; Deats; Harris; Frankie Bash	4:12
11.	"Scars"	Carter; Sweet; Akers; Matthew Schaeffer; Jake Kosich; Johnny Kosich	Baby Keem; Sweet; Bridgeway; Jake the Snake; Beach Noise	4:26
12.	"Durag Activity" (with Travis Scott)	Carter; Jacques Webster II; Justin Howze	Brick!	3:44
13.	"Booman"	Carter; Sam Nortey^{[c]}; Nii Morton^{[c]}	Baby Keem; Jake the Snake; Beach Noise	2:35
14.	"First Order of Business"	Carter; Sweet	Baby Keem; Sweet	2:48
15.	"Vent"	Carter; Duckworth; Natche; Mark Spears; Jason Pounds	Baby Keem; DJ Dahi; Sounwave; J.Lbs; Bridgeway^{[a]}; Beach Noise^{[a]}	2:16
16.	"16"	Carter; Natche; Jeff Kleinman	DJ Dahi; Kleinman	2:36
Total length:				53:44

B side additional track listing
No.	Title	Writer(s)	Producer(s)	Length
1.	"Lost Souls" (with Brent Faiyaz)	Carter; Christopher Wood; Sweet; Akers; Lebrun	Baby Keem; Sweet; Bridgeway; Jake the Snake; Che Ecru; Beach Noise	4:29
2.	"Hooligan"	Carter; Sweet; Jordan Ortiz; Beck Norling; Robert Fairfax III	Sweet; Oogie Mane; Faxonly; Pilgrim	2:36
3.	"No Sense"	Carter; Sweet	Baby Keem; Sweet	2:53
Total length:				9:58

Deluxe edition (bonus tracks)
No.	Title	Writer(s)	Producer(s)	Length
1.	"A Life of Pain"	Carter; Sweet; Akers	Baby Keem; Bridgeway; Sweet	1:52
2.	"Killstreaks" (with Don Toliver and PinkPantheress)	Carter; Toliver; Victoria Walker; Sweet; Akers	Bridgeway; Sweet; Grandmaster Vic^{[a]}	3:35
3.	"Patience Interlude"	Carter; Dylan Clearly-Krell; Johnny Kosich; Schaeffer	Baby Keem; Dez Wright; Beach Noise	2:21
4.	"Naked Freestyle"	Carter; Jeff Page; Joe Cooley; Rodney Oliver; LaTour	Cardo	1:48
5.	"Fine China"	Carter; Cleary-Krell; Wright	Baby Keem; Sweet; Wright	2:08
6.	"Highway 95"	Carter; Charles Fox^{[d]}; Cydel Young; Donte Perkins; John Bloom; Norman Gimbel^{[d]}; Akers; Tobias Breuer	Baby Keem; Bridgeway; Tae Beast; Rascal; Bloom; Lauryn Hill	1:31
7.	"Bank Account" (with Lil Uzi Vert)	Carter; Symere Woods; Danyal Ahmed; Mark Williams; Raul Cubina; Akers	Baby Keem; Bridgeway; Soldado; Ojivolta	3:34
Total length:				16:49

Notes

- ^{^[a]} denotes additional producers
- All tracks are stylized in all lowercase.
- "Trademark USA" features uncredited additional vocals from Rosalía
- "Vent" features uncredited additional vocals from Kendrick Lamar

Sample credits

- ^{^[b]} "Scapegoats" contains samples from "Redemption", written by Josiah Wise, as performed by Serpentwithfeet; and "Unlucky", written by Lindsay Olsen and Gueorgui Linev, as performed by Wakan.
- ^{^[c]} "Booman" contains a sample from "Yei Baa Gbe Wolo", written by Sam Nortey and Nii Morton, as performed by Hugh Masekela.
- ^{^[d]} "Highway 95" contains a sample from "Killing Me Softly", written by Charles Fox and Norman Gimbel, as performed by Fugees.

== Personnel ==
Credits adapted from official liner notes.

- Derek "206Derek" Anderson – recording (9), mixing (12)
- Matt Schaeffer – recording (10, 11, 15)
- Johnny Kosich – assistant engineering (1–6, 9, 10, 11, 15, 16), recording (1, 3–5, 7–14, 16)
- Jake the Snake – assistant engineering (1, 3–5, 7–14, 16)
- Scott Moore – assistant engineering (3, 4, 10, 11)
- Curtis "Sircut" Bye – assistant engineering (5, 7, 8, 12–14)
- Ray Donghwan Kim – assistant engineering (6, 15)
- Jacob Bryant – assistant engineering (7, 8, 12–14)
- MixedByAli – mixing (5, 7, 8, 12–14)
- James Hunt – mixing (1–4, 6, 9–11, 15, 16), recording (1–4, 6, 9–11, 15)
- Nicolas De Porcel – mastering (1–16)

== Charts ==
=== Weekly charts ===
Weekly chart performance for The Melodic Blue
Chart (2021–2022)	Peak position
Australian Albums (ARIA)	21
Austrian Albums (Ö3 Austria)	26
Belgian Albums (Ultratop Flanders)	28
Belgian Albums (Ultratop Wallonia)	87
Canadian Albums (Billboard)	5
Danish Albums (Hitlisten)	29
Dutch Albums (Album Top 100)	23
Finnish Albums (Suomen virallinen lista)	35
French Albums (SNEP)	93
German Albums (Offizielle Top 100)	67
Irish Albums (Official Charts)	23
Lithuanian Albums (AGATA)	11
New Zealand Albums (RMNZ)	12
Norwegian Albums (VG-lista)	9
Scottish Albums (Official Charts)	94
Swedish Albums (Sverigetopplistan)	59
Swiss Albums (Schweizer Hitparade)	18
UK Albums (Official Charts)	49
UK R&B Albums (Official Charts)	11
US Billboard 200	5

=== Year-end charts ===
2021 year-end chart performance for The Melodic Blue
Chart (2021)	Position
US Top R&B/Hip-Hop Albums (Billboard)	70

2022 year-end chart performance for The Melodic Blue
Chart (2022)	Position
US Billboard 200	66
US Top R&B/Hip-Hop Albums (Billboard)	44

2023 year-end chart performance for The Melodic Blue
Chart (2023)	Position
US Billboard 200	84
US Top R&B/Hip-Hop Albums (Billboard)	44

== Certifications ==
Certifications for The Melodic Blue
Region	Certification	Certified units/sales
Canada (Music Canada)	Gold	40,000^{‡}
Denmark (IFPI Danmark)	Gold	10,000^{‡}
New Zealand (RMNZ)	Platinum	15,000^{‡}
Poland (ZPAV)	Gold	10,000^{‡}
United Kingdom (BPI)	Silver	60,000^{‡}
United States (RIAA)	2× Platinum	2,000,000^{‡}
^{‡} Sales+streaming figures based on certification alone.
