= Infinity Song =

American soft rock band

Background information
- Origin: New York City, New York, U.S.
- Genres: Soft rock; R&B; indie
- Labels: The Peace Industry Music Group; Roc Nation
- Members: Abraham Boyd; Angel Boyd; Israel Boyd; Momo Boyd
- Past members: Victory Boyd
- Website: infinitysongmusic.com

Infinity Song concert at Elysée Montmartre in Paris, 26 June 2025

Infinity Song is an American soft rock band composed of siblings Abraham, Angel, Israel and Momo Boyd. Based in New York City, the group has released three albums under record label Roc Nation.

== History ==
Infinity Song is a family band made up of members Abraham, Angel, Israel and Momo Boyd, with their sister Victory also being a part of the band for a few years. The four siblings grew up in Detroit, Michigan and later moved to New York City performing in a choir directed by their father, John Boyd, and their early home life was filled with "singing and writing refrains".

In the mid-2010s, the band started performing around the city, particularly in Bethesda Terrace in Central Park, Grand Central Station, and Times Square. In 2014, they had a chance encounter with Tori Kelly, which resulted in their appearing on The View. In 2016, director Jeymes Samuel sent a video clip that he had seen of the band busking in Central Park to Jay Z. The band was then invited to perform for Jay-Z at the offices of his Roc Nation record label, after which Jay Z signed them to a recording contract.

The band thereafter appeared on The Late Show With Stephen Colbert and Good Morning America. Through family friend Jon Batiste, the band also became connected with Kanye West, and "made substantial contributions to West's gospel-tinged Jesus Is King album", for which they participated in several capacities including writing and producing songs and participating in West's Sunday Service Choir.

Momo Boyd was featured on Baby Keem's "Good Flirts" along with Kendrick Lamar, the song being the lead single from Keem's second studio album Ca$ino (2026). She released her debut solo EP, Miss Michigan, on April 10, 2026.

On April 27, 2026, the band was featured in an NPR Tiny Desk Concert. On June 12, they released their fourth, eponymous studio album, which was preceded by the singles "One Foot Out" and "Hurricane".

== Releases and reviews ==
The band's 2020 album, Mad Love, was reviewed in American Songwriter, which praised the album, saying: "It sways, crashes, ducks and dives. But what's even better than the sonic movements it provides is the familial closeness the record ushers into a room". While calling the band's songs heartfelt, colorful, and kind, the review also noted "an expertise and a tight understanding of composition". Bossip's 2020 review said that Infinity Song "touch the sky with Hov approved heavenly harmonies on debut Album Mad Love… just pure delectable, soulful, undeniably beautiful music to our ears".

The Deluxe, an extended version of their Mad Love album, followed in 2021, and in 2023, Infinity Song released their EP, Metamorphosis, including six original songs and a cover of the Fleetwood Mac song, "Dreams". Their song, "Hater's Anthem", went viral on TikTok.

In February 2024, Uproxx listed the band as one of its "best bets for best new artist at the 2025 Grammys", praising their "breezy arrangements and lush harmonies", and saying in their review that the band's records "sound right at home between cuts from The Byrds, Joni Mitchell, Buffalo Springfield and other Laurel Canyon legends". In March 2024, the band announced their first world tour.

== Band members ==
=== Current members ===
- Abraham Boyd – vocals
- Angel Boyd – vocals
- Israel Boyd – guitars, vocals
- Momo Boyd – guitars, bass guitar, vocals

=== Former members ===
- Victory Boyd – vocals, guitars

== Discography ==
=== Studio albums ===
List of albums with selected details
Title	Album details	Notes
Infinity's Song	Released: August 21, 2015; Label: The Peace Industry Music Group; Format: Streaming	
Mad Love	Released: October 2, 2020; Label: Roc Nation; Format: Streaming, CD	Deluxe release: June 30, 2021
Metamorphosis Complete	Released: June 14, 2024; Label: Roc Nation; Format: Streaming	
INFINITY SONG	Released: June 12, 2026; Label: Roc Nation; Format: Streaming	

=== Extended plays ===
List of extended plays with selected details
Title	Extended play details	Notes
Infinite Christmas	Released: November 19, 2021; Label: Roc Nation; Format: Streaming	Re-release: November 29, 2024 (under UMG Recordings)
Metamorphosis	Released: October 20, 2023; Label: Roc Nation; Format: Streaming	
