= List of people from Las Vegas =

This is an incomplete list of notable natives and residents of the Las Vegas metropolitan area, which includes Las Vegas, Nevada. Natives are individuals born in the Las Vegas metropolitan area. Non-natives are people who play or played a notable role in the history of Las Vegas or the Las Vegas metropolitan area while residing in the city.

Notable people from Las Vegas
| Name | LV native? | Profession | Known for |
|---|---|---|---|
| Michele Abbate | Yes | race car driver | NASCAR, Trans-Am Series |
| Sheldon Adelson | No | businessman | Las Vegas Sands |
| Andre Agassi | Yes | professional tennis player | philanthropy |
| Anetra | Yes | drag queen | RuPaul's Drag Race |
| Dre Allen | No | producer, director, singer-songwriter | member of R&B group IV Xample |
| Angel Alvarez | Yes | soccer player | soccer |
| Bob Anderson | No | singer/impressionist | headlined every major Strip resort for half a century; acclaimed as "The World's Greatest Singing Impressionist" |
| Louie Anderson | No | comedian | |
| Criss Angel | No | magician | Criss Angel Mindfreak |
| Greg Anthony | Yes | professional basketball player | played for UNLV, NBA |
| Steve Aoki | No | musician, DJ and music executive | |
| DJ Ashba | No | musician and music producer | played guitar in Guns N' Roses from 2009 to 2015, current lead guitarist for Sixx:A.M. |
| Zak Bagans | No | paranormal Investigator | host of Ghost Adventures |
| Shamir Bailey | Yes | singer-songwriter | |
| H. Lee Barnes | No | nonfiction and fiction author | U.S. veteran with honors |
| Bobby Baldwin | No | professional poker player and casino executive | |
| Toni Basil | No | singer-songwriter and actress | |
| Jillian Bell | Yes | actress | Fist Fight, 22 Jump Street |
| Tony Bellamy | Yes | musician and vocalist | member of the rock band Redbone; inducted into the Yes American Music Hall of Fame in 2008 |
| Alexandra Berzon | No | journalist | primary reporter for a Las Vegas Sun Pulitzer Prize-winning series |
| Tyler Bey | Yes | basketball player | basketball player in the Israeli Basketball Premier League |
| Big B | No | rapper | Suburban Noize Records |
| Robert Bigelow | Yes | entrepreneur | founder and CEO of Bigelow Aerospace |
| Dan Bilzerian | No | | professional poker player |
| Benny Binion | No | businessman | founder and owner of several properties, including Binion's |
| Joey Bishop | No | entertainer | Rat Pack |
| Tristan Blackmon | Yes | soccer player | soccer |
| Michael Blazek | Yes | baseball player | Major League Baseball |
| Sam Boyd | No | casino owner | |
| Mike Branch | No | commercial pilot | former member of the Louisiana State Senate |
| Toni Braxton | No | singer | |
| David Brenner | No | comedian | |
| Kris Bryant | Yes | professional baseball player | outfielder for the Colorado Rockies |
| Michael Bunin | No | actor | Superstore |
| Rae Burrell | Yes | professional basketball player | WNBA |
| Lance Burton | No | performer | |
| Kurt Busch | Yes | race car driver | NASCAR |
| Kyle Busch | Yes | race car driver | NASCAR |
| Sam Butera | No | entertainer, saxophone player | |
| Nicolas Cage | No | actor | Academy Award-winning actor |
| A E Cahlan | No | newspaper publisher and executive | |
| Matthew Callister | Yes | politician | senator of Nevada 1992–1995 |
| Alisyn Camerota | No | journalist | |
| Gina Carano | No | MMA fighter, actress | first female MMA fight with television coverage; star of Steven Soderbergh's Haywire |
| Ben Carey | No | guitarist | |
| Charisma Carpenter | Yes | actress | Buffy the Vampire Slayer, Angel |
| Carrot Top | No | actor and comedian | |
| Nick Carter | No | musician | front-runner of the Backstreet Boys |
| Joe Castro | No | jazz pianist | Atlantic Records |
| Daveigh Chase | Yes | actress | |
| Andrew Cherng | No | business executive | founder of Panda Express |
| Frank Cifaldi | Yes | video game journalist and developer | founder of Video Game History Foundation |
| Spencer Clark | Yes | race car driver | NASCAR |
| Wilbur Clark | No | businessman | ran El Rancho Vegas and Desert Inn |
| Norm Clarke | No | gossip columnist | Las Vegas Review-Journal |
| David Cohen | No | Jockey | |
| Rico Constantino | Yes | professional wrestler | |
| Christopher Convery | Yes | actor | |
| David Copperfield | No | illusionist | |
| Emina Cunmulaj | No | philanthropist, supermodel | |
| Randall Cunningham | No | football player | |
| Vashti Cunningham | Yes | high jumper | |
| Tony Curtis | No | actor | |
| Jay Cutler | No | IFBB professional bodybuilder | Mr. Olympia |
| D'manti | Yes | singer and songwriter | |
| Laura Dahl | Yes | fashion designer | |
| Moe Dalitz | No | developer | casino owner and executive |
| Abby Dalton | Yes | actress | The Joey Bishop Show, Falcon Crest |
| Conrad Daniels | No | darts player | |
| Baron Davis | No | professional basketball player | |
| Bill Davis | No/Yes | darts player | |
| Mark Davis | No | NFL team owner | owner of Las Vegas Raiders and Las Vegas Aces |
| Ricky Davis | Yes | professional basketball player | |
| Sammy Davis Jr. | No | singer and entertainer | Rat Pack |
| Sylvia Day | No | writer | Bared to You |
| Maison Des Champs | No | pro-life activist | free solo climbing tall buildings to raise awareness and funds for pro-life organizations. |
| Céline Dion | No | singer | |
| Leah Dizon | Yes | model, singer | |
| Snoop Dogg | No | artist | rapper, singer-songwriter, actor |
| Sheena Easton | No | singer-songwriter, actress, designer | |
| Jeremy Elbertson | No | Twitch streamer | won the League of Their Own award at the Streamer Awards 2022 as Jerma985 |
| Deryk Engelland | No | professional hockey player | defenseman for the Vegas Golden Knights, formerly of the Las Vegas Wranglers |
| Kataluna Enriquez | Yes | beauty queen, model, fashion designer | first trans woman to win Miss Nevada USA pageant |
| Jack Entratter | No | businessman | ran Sands Hotel and Casino |
| Mickey Faerch | No | burlesque dancer and actress | Burlesque Hall of Fame |
| Terry Fator | No | ventriloquist | |
| Herbie Faye | No | actor | |
| Frank Fertitta III | Yes | businessman | founder and CEO of Station Casinos |
| Lorenzo Fertitta | Yes | businessman | |
| Dayvid Figler | Yes | attorney, podcaster, writer | |
| Siegfried Fischbacher | No | entertainer | Siegfried & Roy |
| Todd Fisher | No | actor, director, producer, business executive | |
| Flavor Flav | No | rapper, producer | rap music artist and reality television personality |
| Marc-André Fleury | No | professional hockey player | goaltender for the Vegas Golden Knights |
| Justin Flom | No | magician, performer | |
| Brandon Flowers | Yes | musician | The Killers' frontman |
| William P. Foley II | No | businessman | owner of the Vegas Golden Knights |
| Aaron Fotheringham | Yes | extreme wheelchair athlete | first person to do a backflip, double backflip, and front flip in a wheelchair |
| Redd Foxx | No | entertainer | |
| Mat Franco | No | performer | |
| Tony Fredianelli | No | musician | Third Eye Blind guitarist |
| John C. Frémont | No | explorer | |
| Charles Frias | No | philanthropist, entrepreneur | |
| Spencer Gallagher | Yes | NASCAR driver | |
| Danny Gans | No | impersonator | Danny Gans Theater at The Mirage |
| Brendan Gaughan | No | race car driver | NASCAR |
| Jackie Gaughan | No | businessman | casino owner |
| Michael Gaughan | No | businessman | casino owner |
| Nicholas Georgiade | No | actor and casino host | 1959 ABC television series The Untouchables; casino host at the Riviera Hotel and Casino |
| Jason Giambi | No | baseball player | |
| Carolyn Goodman | No | educator | mayor of Las Vegas |
| Mike Goodman | No | casino employee | pit boss at The Dunes, author of best-selling book How to Win |
| Oscar Goodman | No | attorney | defense attorney, Mayor of Las Vegas |
| Mikalah Gordon | Yes | | American Idol, season 4 finalist |
| Matt Goss | No | singer | |
| Steffi Graf | No | professional tennis player | former World No. 1 German tennis player; philanthropist |
| Noah Gragson | Yes | NASCAR driver | |
| Max Green | Yes | musician | Escape the Fate |
| Shecky Greene | No | entertainer | |
| Hank Greenspun | No | newspaper publisher | newspaper publisher and land developer |
| Katie Grimes | Yes | swimmer | 2020 Summer Olympics |
| Nate Grimes | Yes | basketball player | basketball player in the Israeli Basketball Premier League |
| Lance Gross | No | actor | |
| Matthew Gray Gubler | Yes | actor | Spencer Reid in Criminal Minds |
| Lonnie Hammargren | No | doctor, politician | |
| Corinna Harney | No | actress | Playboy Playmate |
| Bryce Harper | Yes | professional baseball player | outfielder for the Philadelphia Phillies |
| Rick Harrison | No | pawn shop owner | Pawn Stars |
| Carey Hart | Yes | former professional FMX rider, off-road truck racer | |
| Spencer Haywood | No | professional basketball player | |
| Riley Herbst | Yes | NASCAR driver | |
| Catherine Hickland | No | actress, singer, stage hypnotist | |
| Adam Hicks | Yes | actor | |
| Ryan Higa | No | entertainer, YouTuber | |
| Cha Cha Hogan | No | comedian, musician, entertainer | |
| Clint Holmes | No | singer-songwriter | |
| James Holzhauer | No | sports gambler, game show contestant | won 32 consecutive Jeopardy! games, set several earnings records |
| Roy Uwe Ludwig Horn | No | entertainer | Siegfried & Roy |
| Steven Horsford | Yes | politician | U.S. representative for Nevada |
| Derek Hough | No | professional ballroom dancer | won Dancing with the Stars |
| Julianne Hough | No | actress, country singer, professional ballroom dancer | won Dancing with the Stars twice, won Top New Artist at ACM Awards 2008 |
| Tony Hsieh | No | business executive | founder and CEO of Zappos |
| Howard Hughes | No | businessman | casino tycoon and land developer |
| Carl Icahn | No | tycoon | former owner of Stratosphere |
| JackEL | No | DJ, record producer and songwriter | |
| Joe Jackson | No | talent manager | Jackson Five |
| La Toya Jackson | No | singer, actress, model | |
| Michael Jackson | No | singer, dancer, choreographer, actor | |
| Pierre Jackson | Yes | professional basketball player | |
| Reggie Jackson | No | actor | professional baseball player |
| Steven Jackson | Yes | professional football player | National Football League |
| Jenna Jameson | Yes | pornographic actress | |
| Morris R. Jeppson | No | second lieutenant | Enola Gay bombing of Hiroshima |
| Penn Jillette | No | magician | half of the comedy-magic duo Penn & Teller |
| Larry Johnson | No | professional basketball player | NBA |
| Nicole Johnson | No | monster truck driver | Scooby-Doo Monster Jam driver |
| Jan Jones | No | spokesperson | mayor of Las Vegas |
| Danielle Kang | No | professional golfer | |
| Ka$hdami | Yes | rapper | |
| Baby Keem | No | rapper | known for hits such as "Family Ties", "Durag Activity", and "Orange Soda" |
| Hubert Keller | No | chef | Michelin-starred celebrity chef |
| Brian Kelly | No | football player | |
| Kirk Kerkorian | No | developer | International Hotel, MGM Grand |
| Dave Keuning | No | musician | The Killers' lead guitarist |
| Jimmy Kimmel | No | comedian | Jimmy Kimmel Live! |
| B.B. King | No | blues legend | |
| Scott Kirchner | No | darts player | |
| Larry Koentopp | No | baseball executive | Las Vegas Stars majority owner, first-ever Triple-A franchise in Las Vegas (1983) |
| King Lizzard | No | entertainer | |
| George Knapp | No | journalist | 2008 Peabody Award |
| Gladys Knight | No | singer, actress | |
| Jack Kramer | Yes | tennis player | |
| Jeff Kutash | No | Golden Globe- and Emmy-winning show producer | designed, choreographed, wrote, directed, and produced Splash, which ran at the Riviera Hotel and Casino for almost a quarter-century and won "International Show of the Year" ten consecutive years |
| Iris Kyle | No | 10-time overall Ms. Olympia professional bodybuilder | International Federation of Bodybuilding & Fitness |
| Meyer Lansky | No | mobster financier | |
| T. J. Lavin | Yes | | |
| Peter Lawford | No | actor | Rat Pack |
| Steve Lawrence | No | singer, actor | Steve and Eydie |
| Robin Leach | No | writer | TV show host |
| Hae Un Lee | No | businessman | Lee's Discount Liquor |
| Susie Lee | No | politician | U.S. representative for Nevada |
| Jenny Lewis | Yes | musician | Rilo Kiley |
| Jerry Lewis | No | entertainer | |
| Liberace | No | entertainer | inspired Liberace Museum |
| Peter Lik | No | landscape photographer | |
| Rich Little | No | legendary impressionist, comedian | |
| Nikkita Lyons | Yes | wrestler | WWE |
| Greg Maddux | No | pitcher | Major League Baseball |
| Holly Madison | No | Playboy Playmate | The Girls Next Door, Holly's World |
| George J. Maloof Jr. | No | businessman | hotel operator; member of the Maloof Family |
| Alfred Mann | No | businessman, entrepreneur | billionaire, founder of MannKind Corporation |
| Frank Marino | No | impersonator | longest running, successful, nightly performing headliner in the history of Las Vegas |
| Shawn Marion | No | forward, National Basketball Association | played for UNLV |
| Anthony Marnell III | Yes | architect, businessman, and casino developer | Marnell Corrao Associates |
| Dean Martin | No | singer and entertainer | Rat Pack |
| Greg Martinez | Yes | left fielder | Major League Baseball |
| Catherine Cortez Masto | Yes | politician | U.S. senator for Nevada |
| Floyd Mayweather Jr. | No | boxer | |
| Rich McCormick | Yes | politician | U.S. representative for Georgia |
| Wayne McCullough | No | boxer | Olympic Games silver medalist World Boxing Council Bantamweight Champion |
| Conor McGregor | No | professional MMA fighter | |
| Christine McGuire | No | singer | McGuire Sisters |
| Phyllis McGuire | No | actress/singer | McGuire Sisters, mistress of Chicago Mob Boss Sam Giancana |
| John H. Meier | No | | former business adviser of Howard Hughes |
| Marvin Menzies | No | college basketball coach | UNLV Runnin Rebels head coach |
| Mike Meyers | Yes | baseball outfielder | |
| Bob Miller | No | politician | former governor |
| Ross Miller | No | politician | |
| Frank Mir | Yes | mixed martial artist | heavyweight champion in the UFC |
| Kevin Mitnick | No | computer consultant | |
| Farrah Moan | No | drag queen and model | RuPaul's Drag Race contestant |
| Irwin Molasky | No | real estate developer, television and movie producer | Lorimar Productions |
| Chris Molnar | No | writer, editor and publisher | co-founder of Las Vegas' first independent bookstore The Writer's Block and Archway Editions |
| Tana Mongeau | Yes | YouTuber, rapper | |
| Jessica Moore | No | journalist | KSNV anchor and reporter |
| Pat Morita | No | actor | The Karate Kid |
| Matt Morrow | No | YouTuber | gambling large sums of money at casinos |
| Michael Morton | No | businessman and restaurateur | co-founder of the N9NE Group |
| Jon Moxley | No | professional wrestler | former World Wrestling Entertainment wrestler, previously known as Dean Ambrose |
| Stan Mullis | Yes | NASCAR driver | |
| DeMarco Murray | Yes | professional football player | NFL |
| James Murren | No | businessman | |
| Joe Muscaglione | No | wine consultant, BMC Fine Spirits | former Babbo, NY wine director TAO Las Vegas |
| Kevin Na | No | professional golfer | |
| Sam Nazarian | No | businessman | CEO and founder of Los Angeles-based SBE Entertainment and SLS Hotels |
| Ne-Yo | No | R&B singer-songwriter | |
| Dasha Nekrasova | Yes | actress and podcaster | co-host of Red Scare with Anna Khachiyan |
| Roy Nelson | Yes | athlete | professional mixed martial artist |
| Harry Newman | No | professional football player | College Football Hall of Fame, NFL All-Pro |
| Wayne Newton | No | singer | part-owner of Aladdin |
| Paige O'Hara | No | actress | |
| Pierre Omidyar | No | businessman | chairman and founder of eBay |
| Donny Osmond | No | entertainer | Donny & Marie in Las Vegas |
| Olive Marie Osmond | No | singer, doll designer, and talk show host | |
| Lora Ottenad | No | professional bodybuilder | |
| Joseph Otting | No | businessman | |
| Dan Hewitt Owens | No | actor | |
| George Parros | No | professional hockey player | |
| Andrew Pascal | No | businessman | |
| Vinnie Paul | No | professional drummer and musician | |
| Tommy Pham | Yes | professional baseball player | outfielder for the Tampa Bay Rays |
| Vince Phillips | No | professional boxer | |
| Bill Porter | No | famous audio engineer | |
| Milton Prell | No | businessman | owned Sahara and Aladdin hotels |
| Elvis Presley | No | singer and actor | hotel headliner, star of Viva Las Vegas |
| Louie Prima | No | bandleader, musician | |
| Sam Querrey | No | professional tennis player | |
| Ronnie Radke | Yes | musician | Falling in Reverse |
| Ryan Reeves | Yes | professional wrestler | ring name "Ryback" |
| Harry Reid | No | United States senator | |
| Tanner Reif | Yes | race car driver | NASCAR |
| Dan Reynolds | Yes | musician | Imagine Dragons |
| Debbie Reynolds | No | entertainer, business executive | owned Debbie Reynolds' Hollywood Hotel |
| Donald Reynolds | No | business executive, philanthropist | |
| Jim Rhodes | Yes | real estate developer | Rhodes Ranch and Tuscany Village communities |
| RiceGum | Yes | YouTube personality | owner of YouTube channel RiceGum |
| Carlos Rivera | No | singer | |
| Monti Rock III | No | singer, entertainer | creator of A Las Vegas Review, and Disco Tex & The Sex-O-Lettes |
| Jackie Robinson | No | basketball player | UNLV and professional basketball player |
| Sig Rogich | No | political consultant | founder of R&R Advertising; Iceland ambassador |
| Stephanie Romanov | Yes | actress | |
| Jim Root | Yes | musician | Slipknot guitarist |
| Kevin Rose | Yes | podcaster | founder of Digg.com and Revision3 |
| Frank Rosenthal | No | sports handicapper, casino manager | |
| Ryan Ross | Yes | musician | Panic! at the Disco's former guitarist and lyricist |
| Rudy Ruettiger | No | motivational speaker | subject of film Rudy |
| Phil Ruffin | No | businessman | billionaire |
| Larry Ruvo | Yes | philanthropist | |
| Peggy Ryan | No | actress | |
| Tony Sacca | No | singer, showman, TV host and producer | |
| Nia Sanchez | No | Miss USA 2014 | |
| Carlos Santana | No | musician | legendary guitarist |
| Jay Sarno | No | developer | Caesars Palace and Circus Circus |
| Tom Sawyer | No | darts player | |
| Steve Schirripa | No | actor | The Sopranos; entertainment director and consultant for The Riviera |
| Paul Schrier | Yes | actor | star of Saban's Power Rangers series, as Farkas "Bulk" Bulkmeier |
| Cathy Scott | No | author, journalist | The Killing of Tupac Shakur, Murder of a Mafia Daughter |
| Drew Scott | No | reality TV star | star of Property Brothers on HGTV |
| Jonathan Scott | No | reality TV star | star of Property Brothers on HGTV |
| Julian Serrano | No | chef | Michelin two-star chef; executive chef of Picasso |
| Adam Seward | Yes | football player | |
| Earnie Shavers | No | professional boxer | |
| Chasen Shreve | Yes | Major League Baseball pitcher | |
| Bugsy Siegel | No | mobster | developer of the Flamingo |
| Siegfried & Roy | No | performers | |
| Kerry Simon | No | chef | celebrity chef and owner of several restaurants in Las Vegas and Los Angeles |
| Bella Sims | Yes | swimmer | 2020 Summer Olympics |
| Frank Sinatra | No | singer | Rat Pack |
| Keely Smith | No | singer | Louis Prima Band |
| Spencer Smith | No | musician | Panic! at the Disco's former drummer |
| Jim Snyder | No | journalist | KSNV anchor and reporter |
| Kevin Sorbo | No | actor | |
| Jeff Speakman | No | actor, martial arts legend | |
| Britney Spears | No | pop singer | |
| Donald Spence | No | casino manager | comedy writer |
| Brett Sperry | No | Vegas property development | video game designer, fine arts gallerist |
| Anthony Spilotro | No | mafia enforcer | |
| Graham Stephan | Yes | YouTuber | personal finance and investing content |
| Lance Stephenson | No | professional basketball player | shooting guard/small forward for the Los Angeles Lakers |
| Mark Stoermer | Yes | musician | The Killers's bass guitarist |
| Alessandro Stratta | No | celebrity chef | |
| Bob Stupak | No | casino developer | Stratosphere, Vegas World |
| Angela Summers | No | pornographic film actor | |
| Corey Taylor | No | singer | Slipknot's frontman |
| Jerry Tarkanian | No | college basketball coach | former UNLV men's basketball head coach |
| Teller | No | magician | half of the comedy-magic duo Penn & Teller |
| Frank Thomas | No | professional baseball player | |
| TaShawn Thomas | Yes | basketball player | |
| Dina Titus | No | politician | U.S. representative for Nevada, former Nevada state senator |
| Maria Tran | No | actress, filmmaker | |
| Chris Trickle | Yes | race car driver | unsolved murder case |
| Ike Turner | No | singer | |
| Tina Turner | No | singer | |
| Mike Tyson | No | boxer | |
| Robert Urich | No | actor | star of TV series Vega$ |
| Brendon Urie | No | musician | Panic! at the Disco's frontman and only remaining member |
| Edred Utomi | No | stage actor | |
| Ronnie Vannucci Jr. | Yes | musician | The Killers' drummer |
| Nancy Walton Laurie | No | heiress | daughter of Walmart co-founder James "Bud" Walton |
| H Waldman | Yes | professional basketball player | |
| Tommy Ward | No | singer, musician | |
| Darnell Washington | Yes | college football player | |
| Del Webb | No | developer | built Flamingo hotel, owned Sahara |
| Claire Weinstein | | swimmer | Olympic silver medalist freestyle swimmer |
| Evan Weinstock | Yes | Olympic bobsledder | |
| Rutina Wesley | Yes | actor | True Blood |
| Dana White | No | businessman | UFC president |
| Woodrow Wilson | No | politician | first African American to serve in the Nevada Legislature |
| Billy Winn | Yes | professional football player | NFL defensive end |
| Dizzy Wright | No | rapper | |
| Elaine Wynn | No | businesswoman, philanthropist | |
| Steve Wynn | No | real estate developer | The Mirage, Treasure Island, Bellagio and Wynn Las Vegas |
| Kenny Youngblood | No | motorsports artist | designed race car paint schemes including Dale Earnhardt's Wrangler scheme and ZZ Top's Eliminator coupe |
| Pia Zadora | No | Broadway child star, singer, actress | starred in Broadway's Fiddler on the Roof; married corporate merger pioneer/magnate, billionaire, and Riviera Hotel and Casino owner, Meshulam Riklis; headline toured with Frank Sinatra |
| Luis Zamudio | Yes | soccer player | |
| Barry Zito | Yes | professional baseball player | MLB pitcher |
| Asaiah Ziv | Yes | rapper | |
| Jason Zucker | No | professional hockey player | left wing for the Minnesota Wild |
| Anthony E. Zuiker | Yes | writer, producer | creator of CSI: Crime Scene Investigation, CSI: Miami and CSI: NY |
