= DJ Lynnwood =

- Origin: United States
- Genres: House, Dance, EDM
- Years active: 1983 - present
- Label: Various
- Website: http://djlynnwood.com

DJ Lynnwood is an American electronic dance music producer, DJ and radio personality.

== Career ==
DJ Lynnwood's career began in the early 1980s, when he toured the local club scene east of Los Angeles as a youth. In 1983 he landed his first radio gig at the age of ten at a local disco. He was a resident DJ at several local clubs, and when he was 14 began mixing live on the radio, and hosting the Inland Empire' first underground radio program on the college radio station KUOR-FM 89.1 FM. In 1984, DJ Lynnwood and Fred Plimley formed the entity "World Class Productions" producing a dance and concert at the National Orange Show, "Rock of the 80's Take I"

In 1993 Lynnwood was hired at KGGI (99.1 FM) Riverside as the Mix Show Director. His show the "Earthquake Mix" began in June 1993, and was syndicated nationally.

== Discography ==
=== Singles ===
- DJ Lynnwood "FAITH" (Feedback Digital) (2026)
- Ultra Nate, A2 "Fierce" (A2 Productions) (2023)
- Ricky Martin, Bad Bunny & Residente "Cantalo" (Universal Latino) (2023)
- Madonna "I Don't Search, I Find" (Live Nation/Interscope) (2019) *No. 1 BILLBOARD DANCE CLUB SONGS CHART
- Black Eyed Peas x J Balvin "Ritmo" (Sony) (2019)
- Pet Shop Boys "Dreamland" (x2/Awal-Kobalt) (2019)
- Madonna "Crave" (Live Nation/Interscope) (2019) *No. 1 BILLBOARD DANCE CLUB SONGS CHART
- Chrissy Metz "I'm Standing With You (Real Songs) (2019)
- Anggun "Perfect World" (Universal) (2019)
- Madonna "I Rise" (Live Nation/Interscope) (2019) *No. 1 BILLBOARD DANCE CLUB SONGS CHART
- Madonna "Medellin" (Live Nation/Interscope) (2019) No. 1 BILLBOARD DANCE CLUB SONGS CHART
- KC & The Sunshine Band f/Nile Rodgers "Give Me Some More" (Sunshine Sound) (2019)
- Mari Burelle "Let's Hear It For The Boy" (Lit Lyfe Music) (2019)
- Mahkenna x Darko "Ready For Love" (2019)
- MORGXN "Home" (Hollywood Records) (Forthcoming)
- Rocky Morningside "Moonlight" (Brethren Records) (2019)
- Alexis Ashley "Tomorrow" (BRKLYN Records) (2019)
- Katerina Villegas “Hey Mami” (Beauty Queen Records) (2018) (#4 Breakout, Hot Shot Debut •41 BILLBOARD DANCE CLUB SONGS CHART)
- Jennifer Hudson "I'll Fight" (Diane Warren) (2018)
- U2 "Summer Of Love" (Island Records) (2018)
- Anggun "The Good Is Back" (Universal) (2018)
- Taryn Manning "Light" (GLTCHLFE Records) (Unreleased)
- Gattuso f/Myah "Who We Are" (T&T Records) (2018)
- U2 "Love Is Bigger Than Anything In Its Way" (Island Records) (2018) *No. 1 BILLBOARD DANCE CLUB SONGS CHART
- Hilary Roberts “There For You” (Dauman Records) (2018)
- Sabrina Carpenter & Jonas Blue “Alien” (Hollywood) (2018) *No. 1 BILLBOARD DANCE CLUB SONGS CHART
- The Trash Mermaids “XPerial” (The Trash Mermaids Records) (2018)
- Enrique Iglesias “El Bano” (Sony) (2018)
- Gerina & Nomad “Remedy” (Dauman/Feedback Digital) (2018)
- Anggun “What We Remember” (Universal) (2018)
- Keala Settle & Cast of The Greatest Showman “This Is Me” (Atlantic) (2018)
- Joanna Michelle "Blaze The Dancefloor" (Twin Angel) (2018)
- The Trash Mermaids "Cryptic Love" (The Trash Mermaids Records) (2017) *No. 1 Breakout BILLBOARD DANCE CLUB SONGS CHART.
- Katerina Villegas "Dangerous Love" (Beauty Queen Records) (2017) *No. 1 Breakout BILLBOARD DANCE CLUB SONGS CHART.
- Ben Platt and the Original Cast of the Broadway Musical "Dear Evan Hansen" "Waving Through A Window" (Atlantic) (2017) *No. 1 BILLBOARD DANCE CLUB SONGS CHART
- Kato & Sigala f/ Hailee Steinfeld "Show You Love" (Universal Republic) (2017)
- Smash Mouth "Walkin' On The Sun 2017" (BMG) (2017)
- Taryn Manning "GLTCHLFE" (GLTCHLFE Records) (2017) *No. 1 Breakout BILLBOARD DANCE CLUB SONGS CHART.
- Tami "Sugar Shack" (SFM Records) (2017)
- Julia Marie "Just A Moment" (RM Records) (2017)
- Ron Reeser "No Matter What (f/Liam Smith)" (Upscale) (2017) *No. 1 Breakout, Power Pick BILLBOARD DANCE CLUB SONGS CHART
- Anjali "Undress" (Curry Money) (2017) *Power Pick BILLBOARD DANCE CLUB SONGS CHART
- Xenia Ghali "Places (f/Raquel Castro)" (Funky Sheep) (2017) *No. 1, No. 1 Breakout BILLBOARD DANCE CLUB SONGS CHART
- Majesty "Living In The Moonlight" (Daumann Music) (2017)
- Enrique Iglesias featuring Tinashe & Javeda "Duele El Corazon" (English Version) (Sony) (2016) *No. 1 BILLBOARD DANCE CLUB SONGS CHART
- Enrique Iglesias featuring Wisin "Duele El Corazon" (Sony) (2016) *No. 1 BILLBOARD DANCE CLUB SONGS CHART
- Erika Jayne "How Many F**ks" (Pretty Mess) (2016) *No. 1 BILLBOARD DANCE CLUB SONGS CHART
- Xenia Ghali "Under These Lights" (Roc Cartel) (2016) *No. 1 BILLBOARD DANCE CLUB SONGS CHART
- Demi Lovato "Confident" (Hollywood) (2015) *No. 1 BILLBOARD DANCE CLUB SONGS CHART
- Mr. Vegas ft. Pitbull "My Jam" (Mr. 305) (2015)
- ZZ Ward "Love 3X" (Hollywood) (2015) *No. 1 Breakout BILLBOARD DANCE CLUB SONGS CHART
- Mohombi "Universe" (Le Clique) (2015) *No. 1 Breakout BILLBOARD DANCE CLUB SONGS CHART
- Lynn Wood & Kimberly Cole "One, One More Time" (Roc Cartel) (2015)
- Ono "Woman Power" (Twisted) (2105) *No. 1 Breakout BILLBOARD DANCE CLUB SONGS CHART
- Erika Jayne "Crazy" (Pretty Mess) (2015) *No. 1, No. 1 Breakout BILLBOARD DANCE CLUB SONGS CHART
- Ono "Angel" (Twisted) (2014) *No. 1, No. 1 Breakout BILLBOARD DANCE CLUB SONGS CHART
- Shara Strand "RSVP" (D1 Music) (2014) *No. 1 Breakout BILLBOARD DANCE CLUB SONGS CHART
- Erika Jayne "PAINKILLR" (Pretty Mess) (2014) *No. 1, No. 1 BREAKOUT, HOT SHOT DEBUT *35, POWER PICK, GREATEST GAINER 2 CONSECUTIVE WEEKS BILLBOARD DANCE CLUB SONGS CHART
- Demi Lovato "Really Don't Care" (Hollywood Records) *No. 1, No. 1 BREAKOUT, HOT SHOT DEBUT, GREATEST GAINER 3 CONSECUTIVE WEEKS BILLBOARD DANCE CLUB SONGS CHART
- Cole Plante f./Myon & Shane 54 "If I Fall" (Teknicole/Hollywood Records) (2014) *No. 1 BREAKOUT BILLBOARD DANCE CLUB SONGS CHART
- Scotty Boy f/Sue Cho "Shiny Disco Balls" (PopRox) (2014) *No. 1 BILLBOARD DANCE CLUB SONGS CHART
- Demi Lovato "Neon Lights" (Hollywood Records) (2013) *No. 1 BREAKOUT, No. 1 BILLBOARD DANCE CLUB SONGS CHART
- Kimberly Davis "With You" (D1 Music) (2013) *No. 4 BREAKOUT BILLBOARD DANCE CLUB SONGS CHART
- Natalia Kills "Saturday Night" (Cherry Tree/Interscope Records) (2013) *No. 1 BREAKOUT BILLBOARD DANCE CLUB SONGS CHART
- Cole Plante "Lie To Me" (Hollywood Records) (2103) *No. 1 BILLBOARD DANCE CLUB SONGS CHART
- Backstreet Boys "In A Moment Like This" (BMG Music) (2013) *No. 1 BREAKOUT BILLBOARD DANCE CLUB SONGS CHART
- Selena Gomez "Slow Down" (Hollywood Records) (2013) *No. 1 BREAKOUT, GREATEST GAINER, No. 1 BILLBOARD DANCE CLUB SONGS CHART (9/28/2013 Cover Date)
- Havana Brown "Flashing Lights" (2101 Music) (2013) *No. 3 BREAKOUT BILLBOARD DANCE CLUB SONGS CHART, No. 1 BILLBOARD DANCE CLUB SONGS CHART (11/9/2013 Cover Date)
- YLA f/Vanessa Hudgens "$$$ex" (Roc Nation) (2013) *No. 4 BREAKOUT BILLBOARD DANCE CLUB SONGS CHART
- Colette Carr "Never Gonna Happen" (Cherry Tree) (2013) *No. 1 BREAKOUT BILLBOARD DANCE CLUB SONGS CHART
- Demi Lovato "Heart Attack" (Hollywood Records) (2013) *No. 1 BILLBOARD DANCE CLUB SONGS CHART
- D'Manti "Let's Just Dance" (Diamond) 2013 *No. 1 BREAKOUT BILLBOARD DANCE CLUB SONGS CHART
- Yulianna "Don't Take Your Love Away" (Zvon Music) 2013 *No. 5 BREAKOUT BILLBOARD DANCE CLUB SONGS CHART
- Gimm+Icky "Shake That" (Hit Shop) (2013) *No. 1 BREAKOUT BILLBOARD DANCE CLUB SONGS CHART 3/2/2013 Issue
- Enrique Iglesias "Finally Found You" (Universal) (2012) *No. 1 BILLBOARD DANCE CLUB SONGS CHART
- Noelia "My Everything" (Pink Star Music) (2012) *No. 2 BILLBOARD DANCE CLUB SONGS CHART
- Jerad Finck "Runaway" (2012)
- Beyoncé "Love On Top" (Columbia) 2011 *No. 1 BILLBOARD DANCE CLUB SONGS CHART
- Blush "Dance On" (Far East Entertainment Records) 2011 *No. 1 BILLBOARD DANCE CLUB SONGS CHART
- Linnea "Dance Thru Fire" (Linnea & Co) 2011
- Beyoncé "Best Thing I Never Had" (Music World/Columbia) 2011 *No. 1 BILLBOARD DANCE CLUB SONGS CHART
- Gia Bella "Jump" (NYX Extreme) 2011
- Sultan & Ned Shepard f/Nadia Ali "Call My Name" (Harem) 2011 *No. 1 BILLBOARD DANCE CLUB SONGS CHART
- DJ Rayzn "The Playground" (Feedback Digital) 2011
- Kerli "Army of Love" (Island/DefJam) 2011 *No. 1 BILLBOARD DANCE CLUB SONGS CHART
- Dirty Heads "Stand Tall" (Promotional Only) 2011
- Erika Jayne "One Hot Pleasure" (Pretty Mess Records) 2011 *No. 1 BILLBOARD DANCE CLUB SONGS CHART
- La Roux "In For The Kill" (Interscope) 2010 *No. 1 BILLBOARD DANCE CLUB SONGS CHART
- Linkin Park "Waiting For The End" (Warner Music) 2011 *No. 1 BILLBOARD DANCE CLUB SONGS CHART
- Kwanza Jones "Think Again" (Innovation Entertainment) 2010
- Brandon Flowers "Only The Young" (Island/DefJam) 2010
- Kimberly Cole "Smack You" (Crystal Ship) 2010 *No. 1 BILLBOARD DANCE CLUB SONGS CHART
- Margo "Habit" (Daumann Music) 2010
- DJ Irene & DJ Lynnwood "Where's My Bitch" (Moist Music) 2010
- Depeche Mode "Perfect" (Mute) 2010
- DJ Rap f/ Fast Eddie "Drummin' N' Bassin'" (Impropa Records) 2009
- Jet "K.I.A." (EMI) 2009
- Gabriel & Dresden "New Path" (Organized Nature) 2009
- Lynnwood's Revenge "New York" (Feedback Digital) 2009
- Alanis Morissette "Not As We" (Maverick/Warner Bros) 2008 *No. 1 BILLBOARD DANCE CLUB SONGS CHART
- Keri Hilson "Energy" (Interscope) 2008
- Nina Lares "Like Lovers Don't (Feedback Digital) 2008
- Paul Oakenfold f/OneRepublic "Not Over" (Perfecto Digital) 2008
- Club District All Stars "Rock Star" (Texture Recordings) 2008
- herMajesty "Across The Rooftops" (Feedback Digital) 2008
- Barbara Tucker "Love Revolution" (Music Plant) 2008
- Silversun Pickups "Lazy Eye" (Dangerbird) 2008
- Jungle Brothers "I'll House You" (Feedback Digital) 2007
- Lynnwood's Revenge "So Girl Tonight" (Feedback Digital) 2007
- Nelly Furtado "Say It Right" (Interscope) 2007 *No. 1 BILLBOARD DANCE CLUB SONGS CHART
- Funk Slippers "The Way You Move" (Feedback Digital) 2006
- Craig David & Sting "Rise And Fall" (Atlantic) 2005

=== Albums ===
- Rainy Day Rhythms 2 (Feedback Digital) 2013
- Feedback 7.0 (Feedback Digital) 2012
- Feedback 6.0 (Feedback Digital) 2011
- Feedback 5.0 (Feedback Digital) 2010
- Feedback 4.0 (Feedback Digital) 2009
- Feedback 3.0 (Feedback Digital) 2008
- Feedback 2.0 (Feedback Digital) 2008
- Feedback 1.0 (Feedback Digital) 2007
- HouseTrip 2001 (SHR/UC Music) 2001
- HouseTrip 2000 (SHR/UC Music) 2000
- Dance To This (UC Music) 1999
- Four Times Harder Volume 2 (UC Music) 1998
- Keep It Movin' (UC Music) 1998
- Four Times Harder Volume 1 (UC Music) 1997
- Earth Shakin' Deep House (PR Records) 1996
