= Lee's Family Forum =

Indoor arena in Henderson, Nevada, United States

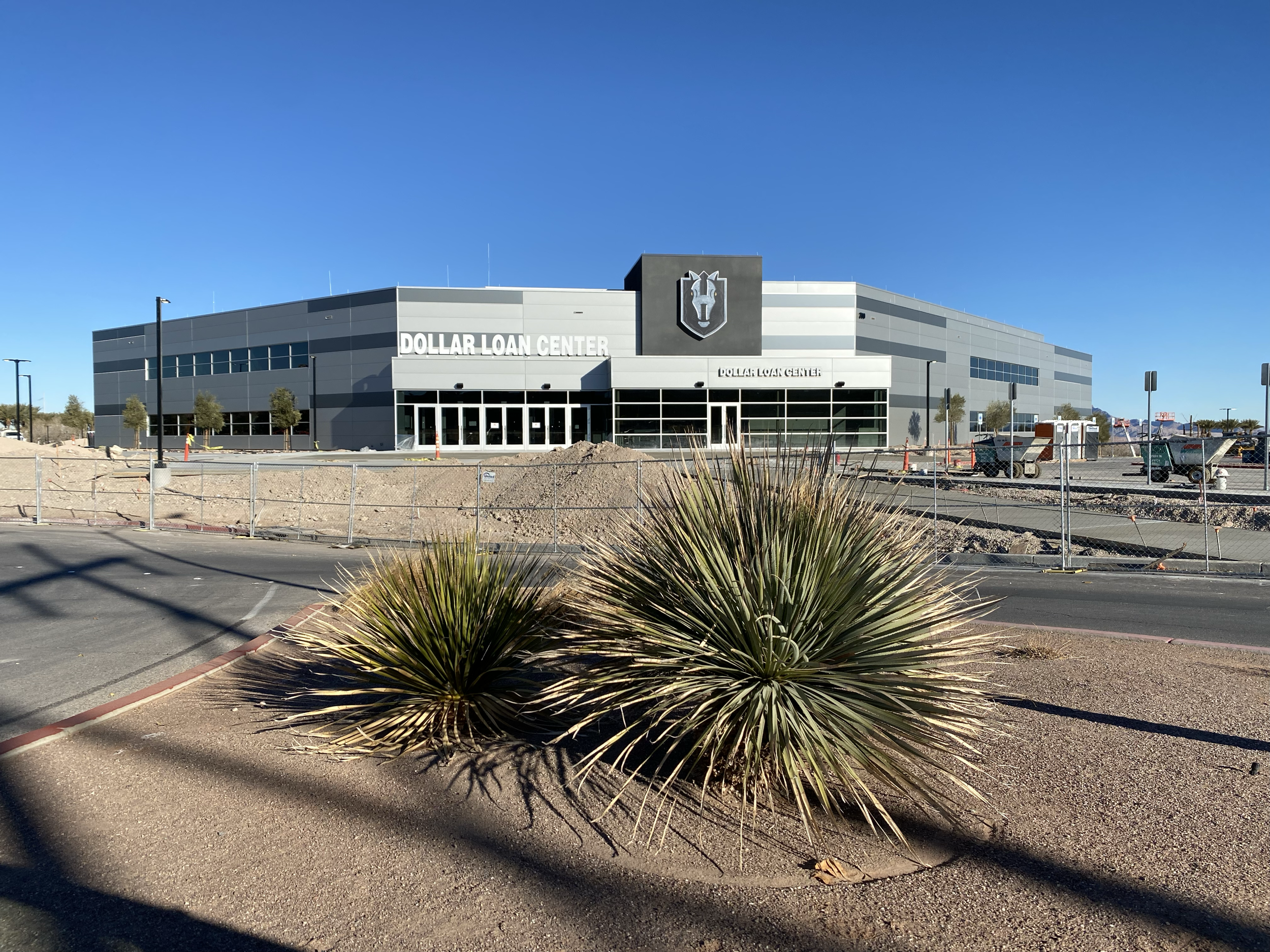
- The arena as seen in 2022

- Location in Nevada Location in the United States Location in North America
- Interactive map of Lee's Family Forum
- Former names: Henderson Event Center (planning); The Dollar Loan Center (2022–2024)
- Address: 200 South Green Valley Parkway
- Location: Henderson, Nevada, U.S.
- Coordinates: 36.018977°N 115.081632°W
- Owner: City of Henderson
- Operator: Black Knight Sports and Entertainment
- Capacity: 5,567

Construction
- Opened: March 8, 2022; 4 years ago
- Cost: $84 million
- Architects: Klai Juba Wald Architects; Perkins&Will
- Structural engineer: Walter P Moore
- General contractor: Whiting-Turner

Tenants
- Henderson Silver Knights (AHL) (2022–present); Vegas Knight Hawks (IFL) (2022–present); Vegas Thrill (PVF/MLV) (2024, 2027–present); Las Vegas Desert Dogs (NLL) (2024–present)

Website
- Venue website

Lee's Family Forum (formerly The Dollar Loan Center) is a multi-purpose indoor arena in Henderson, Nevada, United States. Built on the site of the former Henderson Pavilion, it is the home of the Henderson Silver Knights of the American Hockey League, the Vegas Knight Hawks of the Indoor Football League, the Vegas Thrill of the Pro Volleyball Federation, the Las Vegas Desert Dogs of the National Lacrosse League, and the former home of the NBA G League Ignite of the NBA G League.

It is owned by the City of Henderson and operated by Black Knight Sports and Entertainment, parent company of the Vegas Golden Knights.

== History ==
In February 2020, it was announced that Bill Foley had acquired the San Antonio Rampage of the American Hockey League (AHL) from Spurs Sports & Entertainment, with an intent to relocate the team to Henderson as an affiliate of the Vegas Golden Knights known as the Henderson Silver Knights. The team was to initially play at the Orleans Arena while a new arena was constructed in Henderson. The sale of the team and its relocation to Henderson was approved by the AHL Board of Governors later that month.

The new arena was built at a cost of $84 million on the former site of the Henderson Pavilion amphitheater. Some residents opposed the project because of its location and potential increase on traffic, as well as its use of public financing. The Henderson Pavilion was demolished later in 2020, and work on the arena was underway soon thereafter.

Initially called the Henderson Event Center, a naming rights partnership was announced in March 2021 with Dollar Loan Center, a Las Vegas-based short-term loan company. Under the deal, the arena was named The Dollar Loan Center, disambiguated with the article "The" to differentiate it from the company. The venue hosted its first event on March 8, 2022.

Dollar Loan Center allowed its naming rights to expire on April 1, 2024; the naming rights were subsequently acquired by Lee's Discount Liquor, with the arena being renamed Lee's Family Forum, which was named so in tribute of its founder Hae Un Lee and his son Kenny Lee, who both died three months apart in the latter half of 2021.

== Events ==
Lee's Family Forum seats 5,567 for hockey and football. The arena was constructed primarily to serve as the home arena of the Henderson Silver Knights of the American Hockey League (AHL). The first Silver Knights game played at the arena was on April 2, 2022.

In May 2021, the Indoor Football League (IFL) announced that Foley had purchased an IFL franchise to compete at The Dollar Loan Center. On August 23, 2021, Foley announced that the team would be known as the Vegas Knight Hawks and that Mike Davis would be the franchise's general manager and head coach. On May 10, 2022, it was announced that the IFL National Championship game would be played at The Dollar Loan Center for the 2022–2024 seasons.

The Big West Conference announced on June 24, 2021, that the men's and women's basketball championships would be held at The Dollar Loan Center starting in 2022 – the tournament was the first ticketed event held at the arena.

Since 2022, the Ball Dawgs Classic (known as the Vegas 4 in its inaugural year) has been played at the arena.

In 2024, the Las Vegas Desert Dogs of the National Lacrosse League announced that they would move to the arena from the Michelob Ultra Arena.

== See also ==
- List of indoor arenas in the United States

Events and tenants
Preceded by Orleans Arena	Home of the Henderson Silver Knights; 2022–present	Succeeded by Current
Preceded by Expansion Team	Home of the Vegas Knight Hawks; 2022–present	Succeeded by Current
Preceded by Ultimate Fieldhouse (in Walnut Creek, California)	Home of the NBA G League Ignite; 2022–2024	Succeeded by Franchise disestablished
Preceded by Michelob Ultra Arena	Home of the Las Vegas Desert Dogs; 2024-present	Succeeded by Current
