= Die for My Bitch =

2019 mixtape by Baby Keem

Die For My Bitch

Mixtape by Baby Keem
- Released: July 19, 2019
- Genres: Alternative hip-hop; Trap
- Length: 33:58
- Producers: Baby Keem; Ambezza; Beach Noise; Bekon; Brayon Potillo; Cardo; Cubeatz; Dez Wright; DJ Dahi; Felix Leone; Lyle Leduff; Kal Banx; Keanu Beats; Sounwave

Baby Keem chronology
The Sound of Bad Habit (2018)	Die For My Bitch (2019)	The Melodic Blue (2021)

Singles from Die For My Bitch
- 1. "Invented It" Released: June 11, 2019; 2. "France Freestyle" Released: July 10, 2019; 3. "Orange Soda" Released: July 16, 2019; 4. "Stats" Released: July 19, 2019; 5. "Honest" Released: July 31, 2019

Die for My Bitch (stylized in all caps) is the second mixtape by American rapper and record producer Baby Keem. It was self-released on July 19, 2019. Five singles were released from the mixtape, with "Orange Soda" becoming a sleeper hit.

== Background ==
In a 2026 interview, Baby Keem cited XXXTentacion as a major influence on Die for My Bitch. Keem stated that the mixtape was inspired by the late rapper's approach to music, particularly his ability to blend singing and rapping. According to Keem, XXXTentacion influenced him to realize that he did not have to be exclusively a singer or a rapper and could excel at both. He further cited the song "My Ex" as an example of XXXTentacion's influence on the project.

== Critical reception ==
Professional ratings
Review scores
Source	Rating
AllMusic	3.5/5 stars
HipHopDX	3.8/5

Die for My Bitch was met with generally positive reviews from music critics. Scott Glaysher of HipHopDX praised Baby Keem's vocal performance and beat selection, which he felt were an improvement over his previous work. Writing for AllMusic, Fred Thomas also praised Baby Keem's performance, calling it a "enjoyable, low-stakes listen." XXL ranked Die for My Bitch one of the 50 best hip-hop projects of 2019.

== Track listing ==
No.	Title	Writer(s)	Producer(s)	Length
1.	"Stats"	Alan Mion; Hykeem Carter; Kalon Berry; Keanu Torres	Carter; Kal Banx; Keanu Beats	2:49
2.	"Honest"	Daniel Tennenbaum; Carter; Mark Spears	Bekon; Carter; Sounwave	2:52
3.	"Invented It"	Carter; Torres	Ambezza; Carter; Keanu Beats	1:30
4.	"France Freestyle"	Brayon Potillo; Carter; Berry	Kal Banx; Potillo	2:25
5.	"Bullies"	Dacoury Natche; Carter; Spears; Matt Schaeffer	Beach Noise; DJ Dahi; Carter; Sounwave	3:14
6.	"Moshpit"	Tennenbaum; Carter; Ronald LaTour	Bekon; Cardo; Carter	2:56
7.	"Slice Interlude"	Natche; Carter	DJ Dahi	1:04
8.	"Rockstar P"	Felix Leone; Carter	Leone; Carter	2:16
9.	"Top Ramen"	Carter; Berry	Kal Banx	2:10
10.	"My Ex"	Carter; Johnny Kosich; Lyle Leduff; Schaeffer	Beach Noise; Leduff	2:33
11.	"Buss Her Up"	Carter; Kevin Goringer; Tom Goringer	Cubeatz; Carter	2:19
12.	"Orange Soda"	Carter	Carter; Keanu Beats	2:09
13.	"Not My Bro"	Aaron Gomez; Dylan Cleary-Krell; Carter	Dez Wright; Carter	2:08
14.	"Apologize"	Carter; K. Gorringer; T. Gorringer	Cubeatz; Carter	3:33
Total length:				33:58

Notes

- Credits adapted from Tidal.
- All tracks are stylized in all caps. For example, "Stats" is stylized as "STATS".

== Charts ==
Chart performance for Die for My Bitch
Chart (2020)	Peak position
US Billboard 200	162
