= Henderson Silver Knights =

American Hockey League team in Henderson, Nevada

- City: Henderson, Nevada
- League: American Hockey League
- Conference: Western
- Division: Pacific
- Founded: 1971
- Home arena: Lee's Family Forum
- Colors: Henderson silver, Vegas gold, medieval black
- Owners: Black Knight Sports and Entertainment (Bill Foley, Chair)
- General manager: Tim Speltz
- Head coach: Joel Ward
- Captain: Jaycob Megna
- Media: KMCC; 1230 AM The Game
- Affiliates: Vegas Golden Knights (NHL); Tahoe Knight Monsters (ECHL)

Franchise history
- 1971–1972: Tidewater Wings
- 1972–1975: Virginia Wings
- 1979–1999: Adirondack Red Wings
- 2002–2020: San Antonio Rampage
- 2020–present: Henderson Silver Knights

The Henderson Silver Knights are a professional ice hockey team based in Henderson, Nevada. They are the American Hockey League (AHL) affiliate of the Vegas Golden Knights of the National Hockey League (NHL). The team plays its home games at Lee's Family Forum.

== History ==
The franchise began in 1971 as the Tidewater/Virginia Wings in the Norfolk, Virginia of the greater Hampton Roads area. The team played in Virginia as an owned and operated affiliate of the Detroit Red Wings until 1975 where after a two year suspension they moved to Glens Falls, New York as the Adirondack Red Wings. In 1999, the Red Wings suspended operations of the team. The franchise remained dormant until 2002, when it was purchased by the ownership of the NBA's San Antonio Spurs and resurrected as the San Antonio Rampage. The team then spent the next eighteen years in San Antonio.

On February 6, 2020, the Vegas Golden Knights announced it had purchased the franchise from the Spurs with the intent to relocate it to the Las Vegas area. The purchase and relocation was approved by the league on February 28. The team was announced to initially play at the Orleans Arena in Paradise, Nevada, while the club's new 6,000-seat arena is constructed at the site of the Henderson Pavilion in Henderson, Nevada.

On May 28, 2020, the Vegas Golden Knights announced the team name as the Henderson Silver Knights. The team is named for Nevada's nickname "The Silver State" and adopted the slogan "Home Means Henderson," inspired by the Nevada state song "Home Means Nevada." On August 31, 2020, Emanuel Viveiros was announced as the club's initial head coach. The start of the Silver Knights' inaugural season was delayed due to the COVID-19 pandemic. On February 5, 2021, the team named Patrick Brown as their first captain a day before their inaugural game of the 2020–21 AHL season. The Silver Knights finished their first regular season earning the top seed in the Pacific Division. The Pacific Division was the only division in the AHL that chose to have a postseason, and the teams had a playoff for the John D. Chick Trophy and division title. As the top seed, the team earned a bye to the semifinals, where they swept the San Jose Barracuda in two games before losing the division championship to the second seeded Bakersfield Condors in three games.

When the 2021–22 season schedule was released, it was revealed the Silver Knights would begin play in Henderson earlier than expected with the first home game at the new Dollar Loan Center (now Lee's Family Forum) to take place on April 2, 2022. In the 2022 AHL Calder Cup Playoffs, the Silver Knights lost in the first round to the Colorado Eagles in a 2–0 series sweep.

== Season-by-season records ==
Regular season											Playoffs					
Season	GP	W	L	OTL	SOL	Pts	PCT	GF	GA	Standing	Year	Prelims	1st round	2nd round	3rd round	Finals
2020–21	39	25	13	0	1	51	.654	125	102	1st, Pacific	2021 (Note: The 2021 Calder Cup playoffs were not held; the Pacific Division held a postseason tournament for the division title. The bottom four teams had single-elimination play-in games to qualify for the semifinals (the first two rounds). The division semifinals and finals were best-of-three for the John D. Chick Trophy (the last two rounds).)	—	BYE	BYE	W, 2–0, SJ	L, 1–2, BAK
2021–22	68	35	28	4	1	75	.551	209	203	6th, Pacific	2022	L, 0–2, COL	—	—	—	—
2022–23	72	29	38	0	5	63	.438	201	221	9th, Pacific	2023	Did not qualify				
2023–24	72	28	36	3	5	64	.444	190	243	8th, Pacific	2024	Did not qualify				
2024–25	72	29	38	3	2	63	.438	202	251	10th, Pacific	2025	Did not qualify				
2025–26	72	39	21	7	5	90	.625	263	225	3rd, Pacific	2026	W, 2–0, SJ	L, 1–3, COL	—	—	—

== Players ==
=== Current roster ===
Updated November 22, 2026.

No.	Nat	Player	Pos	S/G	Age	Acquired	Birthplace	Contract
8	(Canada)	Mathieu Cataford	RW	R	21	2025	Chateauguay, Quebec	Golden Knights
13	(Slovakia)	Jakub Demek	RW	L	23	2023	Košice, Slovakia	Golden Knights
50	(United States)	Joe Fleming	RW	R	23	2023	Boston, Massachusetts	Golden Knights
73	(Sweden)	Adam Ginning	D	L	26	2026	Linköping, Sweden	Golden Knights
38	(Canada)	Jordan Gustafson	C	L	22	2025	Ardrossan, Alberta	Golden Knights
59	(United States)	Jackson Hallum	F	L	24	2025	Eagan, Minnesota	Golden Knights
14	(Finland)	Ville Heinola	D	L	25	2026	Honkajoki, Finland	Golden Knights
63	(Canada)	Ben Hemmerling	C	R	22	2024	Sherwood Park, Alberta	Golden Knights
41	(Canada)	Brandon Hickey	D	L	30	2023	Leduc, Alberta	Silver Knights
10	(Sweden)	Alexander Holtz	F	L	24	2024	Saltsjö-Boo, Sweden	Golden Knights
78	(Canada)	Lucas Johansen	D	L	29	2024	Port Moody, British Columbia	Silver Knights
74	(Slovakia)	Viliam Kmec	D	R	22	2025	Košice, Slovakia	Golden Knights
28	(United States)	Tanner Laczynski	C	R	29	2024	Shorewood, Illinois	Golden Knights
30	(Sweden)	Carl Lindbom	G	L	23	2024	Stockholm, Sweden	Golden Knights
20	(United States)	Gerry Mayhew	F	R	33	2026	Wyandotte, Michigan	Silver Knights
89	(Canada)	Riley McKay	LW	L	27	2024	Swan River, Manitoba	Silver Knights
75	(United States)	Mitch McLain (A)	C	L	32	2024	Baxter, Minnesota	Silver Knights
88	(United States)	Jaycob Megna (C)	D	L	33	2025	Plantation, Florida	Golden Knights
46	(Denmark)	Jonas Rondbjerg (A)	RW	L	27	2021	Rungsted, Denmark	Golden Knights
25	(Czech Republic)	Matyas Sapovaliv	C	L	22	2024	Kladno, Czech Republic	Golden Knights
92	(Canada)	Sloan Stanick	F	R	23	2024	Rapid City, Manitoba	Silver Knights
6	(Finland)	Antti Tuomisto	D	R	25	2026	Pori, Finland	Golden Knights
77	(Canada)	Kai Uchacz (A)	C	R	23	2024	Calgary, Alberta	Golden Knights
37	(Finland)	Tuomas Uronen	RW	R	21	2025	Kerava, Finland	Golden Knights
18	(United States)	Alexander Weiermair	C	R	21	2025	Los Angeles, California	Golden Knights
39	(Canada)	Cameron Whitehead	G	R	23	2025	Orleans, Ontario	Golden Knights

=== Team captains ===
- Patrick Brown, 2020–21
- Ryan Murphy, 2021
- Brayden Pachal, 2022–2023
- Jake Bischoff, 2023–2025
- Jaycob Megna, 2025–present

== Team records ==
Records as of the end of the 2025–26 AHL season

Single season records
Goals: 30, Raphaël Lavoie (2025–26)
Assists: 42, Tanner Laczynski (2025–26)
Points: 64, Gage Quinney (2022–23) and Tanner Laczynski (2025–26)
Penalty minutes: 158, Joe Fleming (2025–26)
Wins: 24, Carl Lindbom (2025–26)
GAA: 2.16, Carl Lindbom (2025–26)
SV%: .926, Carl Lindbom (2025–26)
Shutouts: 3, Carl Lindbom (2024–25 and 2025–26)

- Goaltending records need a minimum 25 games played by the goaltender

Single playoff records
Goals: 3, Danny O'Regan (2020–21), Dylan Sikura (2020–21), Jack Dugan (2020–21), and Raphaël Lavoie (2025–26)
Assists: 5, Trevor Connelly (2025–26)
Points: 6, Danny O'Regan (2020–21) and Trevor Connelly (2025–26)
Penalty minutes: 12, Kaedan Korczak (2021–22), Mitch McLain (2025–26), and Kai Uchacz (2025–26)
