= Mitch McLain =

American ice hockey player (born 1993)

- Born: December 9, 1993 (age 32) Baxter, Minnesota, U.S.
- Height: 6 ft 0 in (183 cm)
- Weight: 210 lb (95 kg; 15 st 0 lb)
- Position: Center
- Shoots: Left
- AHL team Former teams: Henderson Silver Knights; Iowa Wild; Milwaukee Admirals; Calgary Wranglers
- NHL draft: Undrafted
- Playing career: 2018–present

Mitchell McLain (born December 9, 1993) is an American professional ice hockey center currently playing for the Henderson Silver Knights in the American Hockey League (AHL).

== Playing career ==
=== Junior ===
McLain played junior hockey with the Langley Rivermen of the BCHL, serving as alternate captain by the end of his first season, and being named captain of the team for his second season with the team. McLain had an excellent sophomore season with the Rivermen, nearly doubling his point total from his rookie year.

=== College ===
McLain played college hockey at Bowling Green State University. Noted as a leader both on and off the ice, McLain served as captain of the team during his senior year, led his team in goals, was in the running for the Hobey Baker Award, and was nominated for the Hockey Humanitarian Award due to his time volunteering teaching special-needs students at a local school.

McLain was named to the All-WCHA First Team in his junior year, and the All-WCHA Second Team in his senior year.

=== Professional ===
After going undrafted in the NHL, and graduating from Bowling Green, McLain made his professional debut for the Iowa Wild of the American Hockey League on March 17, 2018, after signing an amateur-tryout with the team. After playing 10 games that season on the tryout, McLain would earn a full time contract, and invite to the Minnesota Wild's development camp for the following season. McLain would spend four seasons with the Wild, before signing a one-year contract with the Milwaukee Admirals for the 2020–21 AHL season.

After one season with the Admirals, McLain signed a two-year AHL contract with the Calgary Flames top AHL affiliate, the Calgary Wranglers and was noted as a standout of the Flames pre-season training camp for his scoring and physical play.

As a free agent from the Wranglers, McLain joined his fourth AHL club, in signing a two-year contract with the Henderson Silver Knights, the primary affiliate to the Vegas Golden Knights, on July 8, 2024.

== Career statistics ==
			Regular season					Playoffs
Season	Team	League	GP	G	A	Pts	PIM	GP	G	A	Pts	PIM
2012–13	Langley Rivermen	BCHL	54	14	18	32	68	4	1	0	1	6
2013–14	Langley Rivermen	BCHL	57	24	36	60	93	10	4	7	11	15
2014–15	Bowling Green State University	WCHA	38	10	10	20	18	—	—	—	—	—
2015–16	Bowling Green State University	WCHA	42	8	8	16	50	—	—	—	—	—
2016–17	Bowling Green State University	WCHA	40	17	16	33	87	—	—	—	—	—
2017–18	Bowling Green State University	WCHA	41	18	14	32	52	—	—	—	—	—
2017–18	Iowa Wild	AHL	10	1	0	1	8	—	—	—	—	—
2018–19	Iowa Wild	AHL	58	10	10	20	38	8	0	1	1	2
2019–20	Iowa Wild	AHL	28	2	2	4	38	—	—	—	—	—
2019–20	Allen Americans	ECHL	8	4	2	6	6	—	—	—	—	—
2020–21	Iowa Wild	AHL	22	5	2	7	34	—	—	—	—	—
2021–22	Milwaukee Admirals	AHL	76	17	6	23	113	9	0	0	0	16
2022–23	Calgary Wranglers	AHL	56	16	12	28	108	5	0	0	0	4
2023–24	Calgary Wranglers	AHL	63	16	7	23	112	5	1	1	2	4
2024–25	Henderson Silver Knights	AHL	57	13	16	29	63	—	—	—	—	—
2025–26	Henderson Silver Knights	AHL	71	22	17	39	107	6	0	1	1	12
AHL totals			441	102	72	174	621	33	1	3	4	38

== Awards and honors ==
Award	Year	Ref
NCAA
All-WCHA First Team	2017	
All-WCHA Second Team	2018	
