= Jaycob Megna =

American ice hockey player (born 1992)

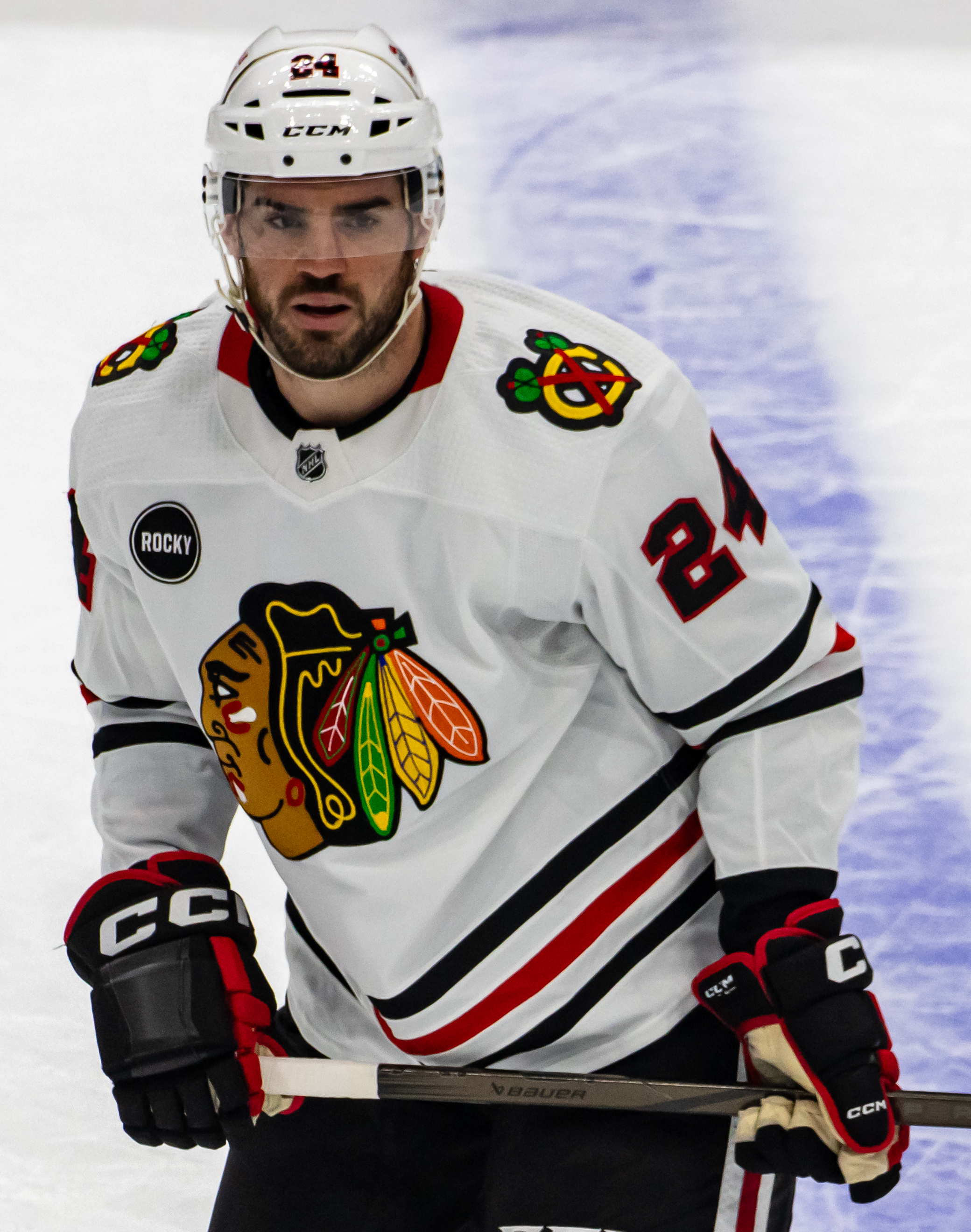
- Megna with the Chicago Blackhawks in 2024
- Born: December 10, 1992 (age 33) Plantation, Florida, U.S.
- Height: 6 ft 6 in (198 cm)
- Weight: 220 lb (100 kg; 15 st 10 lb)
- Position: Defense
- Shoots: Left
- NHL team (P) Cur. team Former teams: Vegas Golden Knights; Henderson Silver Knights (AHL); Anaheim Ducks; San Jose Sharks; Seattle Kraken; Chicago Blackhawks; Florida Panthers
- National team: United States
- NHL draft: 210th overall, 2012; Anaheim Ducks
- Playing career: 2014–present

Jaycob Dalton Megna (born December 10, 1992) is an American professional ice hockey player who is a defenseman and captain for the Henderson Silver Knights of the American Hockey League (AHL) while under contract to the Vegas Golden Knights of the National Hockey League (NHL). He was selected by the Anaheim Ducks in the seventh round, 210th overall, of the 2012 NHL entry draft. He has also played with the San Jose Sharks, Seattle Kraken, Chicago Blackhawks, and Florida Panthers.

== Playing career ==
=== Amateur ===
As a youth, Megna played in the 2005 Quebec International Pee-Wee Hockey Tournament with the Chicago Mission minor ice hockey team. After playing Midget Major U18 hockey for Team Illinois, and committing to play Division 1 hockey with the Nebraska–Omaha Mavericks, Megna signed with the Muskegon Lumberjacks of the United States Hockey League (USHL) on May 11, 2010. During the 2010–11 season, Megna was the co-winner of the USHL Scholar-Athlete Award for his 4.0 GPA at Mona Shores High School. Megna then played three seasons with the Nebraska–Omaha Mavericks, during which he recorded 4 goals, 18 assists, and 40 penalty minutes in 105 games played.

=== Professional ===
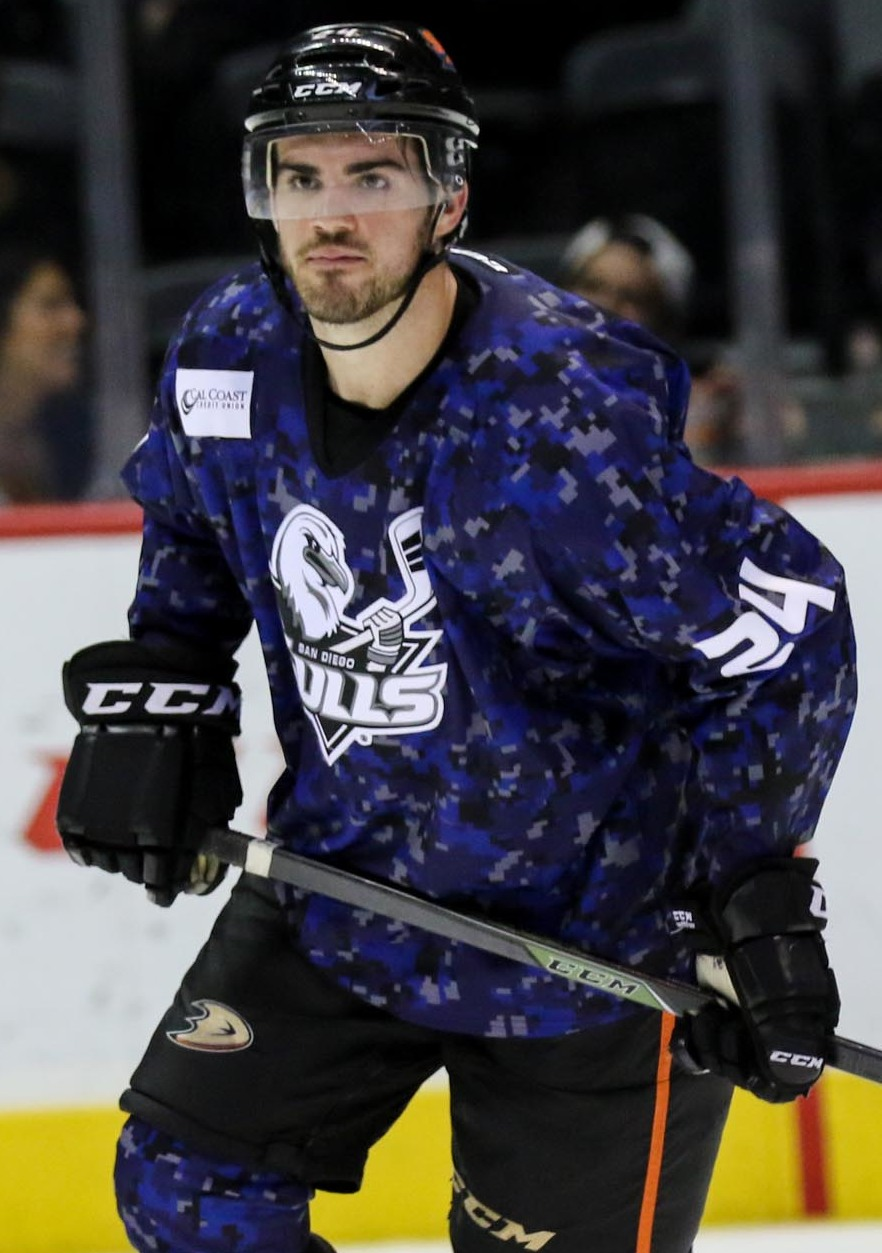
Megna with the San Diego Gulls in 2015

Megna was selected by the Anaheim Ducks of the National Hockey League (NHL) in the seventh round, 210th overall, of the 2012 NHL entry draft. On April 4, 2014, Megna chose to forgo his final year of college eligibility when he signed a three-year entry-level contract with the Ducks. After attending the Ducks 2015 training camp, Megna was assigned to Anaheim's American Hockey League (AHL) affiliate, the San Diego Gulls, to begin the 2015–16 season.

Megna made his NHL debut on April 6, 2017, against the Chicago Blackhawks. Despite the ability to become a free agent on July 1, 2017, Megna signed a two-year contract with the Ducks during the offseason. He recorded his first career NHL point, an assist, in a 6–2 win over the Montreal Canadiens on October 20, 2017.

Megna attended the Ducks 2018 training camp, but was placed on waivers for the purpose of assigning him to the Gulls for the 2018–19 season. In October 2018, Megna was named captain of the Gulls for the 2018–19 AHL season. After playing in 35 games and recording 13 points, Megna was recalled to the NHL on January 31, 2019.

After six seasons within the Ducks organization, Megna left as an unrestricted free agent to sign a one-year, two-way $700,000 contract with the Vegas Golden Knights on July 1, 2019. Assigned to AHL affiliate, the Chicago Wolves, for the duration of the 2019–20 season, Megna added three goals and 10 points through 60 games from the blueline.

As a free agent, Megna was unable to attract an NHL contract, opting to continue in the AHL by signing a one-year deal with the San Jose Barracuda on November 2, 2020. On February 6, 2021, he was named captain of the Barracuda. In July 2021, he signed a one-year contract with the San Jose Sharks. He made his debut for the Sharks on October 30, 2021, in a 2–1 win over the Winnipeg Jets. His first NHL goal came on January 22, 2022, in a 1–7 loss to the Tampa Bay Lightning. He re-signed a two-year contract with the Sharks on May 9, 2022. In the 2022–23 season, Megna was in the midst of his first full season in the NHL, and had already eclipsed his career offensive highs with the Sharks in registering 11 assists and 12 points through 48 regular season games.

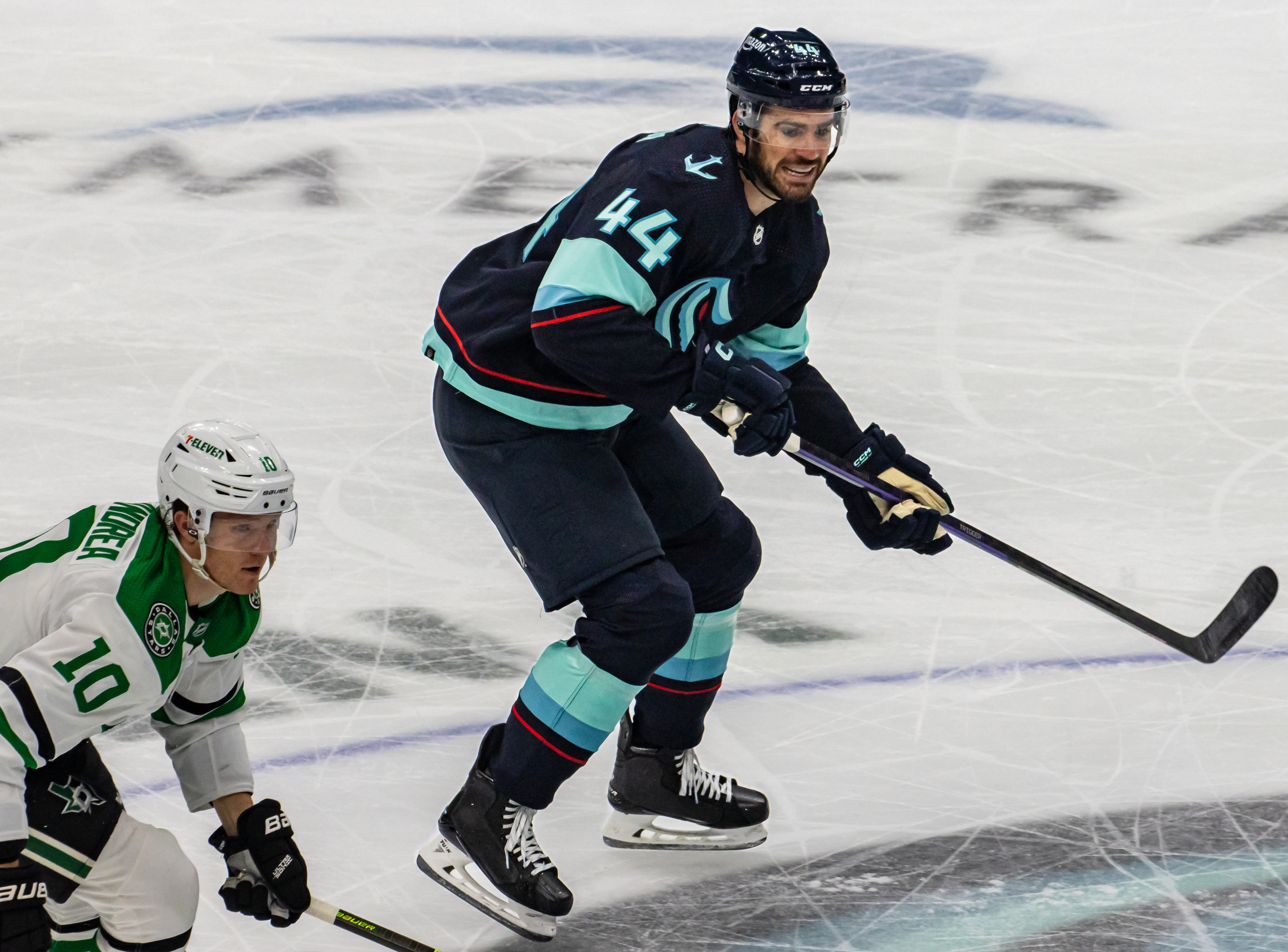
Megna with the Seattle Kraken in 2023

On February 5, 2023, the Sharks traded Megna to the Seattle Kraken in exchange for a 2023 fourth-round selection. He was used sparingly with the Kraken for the remainder of the season, appearing scoreless through just six regular season games. Megna remained a healthy scratch during the club's inaugural playoff appearance, travelling with the roster as a designated "black ace".

Entering the final season under contract with the Kraken in 2023–24, Megna remained on the roster by continuing as a healthy scratch. On December 7, 2023, Megna was assigned on a conditioning stint to AHL affiliate, the Coachella Valley Firebirds, and made two appearances before returning to the Kraken. Still to feature in a game with the Kraken, Megna was later claimed off waivers by the Chicago Blackhawks on January 3, 2024. He made his season and Blackhawks debut, registering an assist, in a 4–1 defeat to the New York Rangers on January 5, 2024. He remained with the Blackhawks for the remainder of the season, notching two assists through 44 appearances.

As an unrestricted free agent from the Blackhawks, Megna was signed to a one-year, two-way contract with the Stanley Cup champions, the Florida Panthers, for the 2024–25 season on July 5, 2024. After going unclaimed on waivers, Megna was assigned to Florida's AHL affiliate, the Charlotte Checkers, for the 2024–25 season. He was recalled by the Panthers on April 2, 2025. When the Panthers won the Stanley Cup on June 17, 2025, Megna was the tenth player to lift the Stanley Cup for the 2025 title.

Following his lone season in Florida, Megna re-signed with the Golden Knights on a two-year contract on July 1, 2025. After starting the 2025–26 season in the AHL with the Henderson Silver Knights, Megna was named Henderson's fifth captain in franchise history on October 21. Later in the season, Megna was called up on January 1, 2026, after an injury to Vegas defenseman Brayden McNabb. Megna made his Golden Knights debut the following day, playing just under 10 minutes in a 4–3 loss to the St. Louis Blues. After a further two games, Megna was reassigned to Henderson on January 8.

== Personal life ==
Megna comes from a family of athletes. His older brother Jayson is, as of 2024, a professional hockey center for the AHL's Colorado Eagles, and his father Jay played collegiate and professional football. His mother, Jacqueline, was an All-American athlete in high school.

== Career statistics ==
=== Regular season and playoffs ===
			Regular season					Playoffs
Season	Team	League	GP	G	A	Pts	PIM	GP	G	A	Pts	PIM
2008–09	Tabor Academy	USHS	25	0	2	2	—	—	—	—	—	—
2009–10	Team Illinois 18U AAA	T1EHL	48	1	12	13	8	—	—	—	—	—
2010–11	Muskegon Lumberjacks	USHL	55	1	17	18	24	6	0	3	3	0
2011–12	University of Nebraska Omaha	WCHA	35	2	3	5	8	—	—	—	—	—
2012–13	University of Nebraska Omaha	WCHA	38	2	5	7	14	—	—	—	—	—
2013–14	University of Nebraska Omaha	NCHC	32	0	10	10	18	—	—	—	—	—
2013–14	Norfolk Admirals	AHL	2	0	0	0	2	—	—	—	—	—
2014–15	Norfolk Admirals	AHL	32	1	4	5	4	—	—	—	—	—
2015–16	San Diego Gulls	AHL	67	0	12	12	14	9	1	0	1	0
2016–17	San Diego Gulls	AHL	62	5	22	27	37	10	0	4	4	8
2016–17	Anaheim Ducks	NHL	1	0	0	0	0	—	—	—	—	—
2017–18	Anaheim Ducks	NHL	14	0	1	1	2	—	—	—	—	—
2017–18	San Diego Gulls	AHL	49	2	10	12	25	—	—	—	—	—
2018–19	San Diego Gulls	AHL	38	2	11	13	20	16	0	2	2	10
2018–19	Anaheim Ducks	NHL	28	1	3	4	12	—	—	—	—	—
2019–20	Chicago Wolves	AHL	60	3	7	10	40	—	—	—	—	—
2020–21	San Jose Barracuda	AHL	36	2	6	8	22	4	0	0	0	2
2021–22	San Jose Barracuda	AHL	22	2	8	10	10	—	—	—	—	—
2021–22	San Jose Sharks	NHL	44	2	6	8	16	—	—	—	—	—
2022–23	San Jose Sharks	NHL	48	1	11	12	21	—	—	—	—	—
2022–23	Seattle Kraken	NHL	6	0	0	0	0	—	—	—	—	—
2023–24	Coachella Valley Firebirds	AHL	2	1	0	1	0	—	—	—	—	—
2023–24	Chicago Blackhawks	NHL	44	0	2	2	22	—	—	—	—	—
2024–25	Charlotte Checkers	AHL	64	2	14	16	23	—	—	—	—	—
2024–25	Florida Panthers	NHL	8	0	0	0	2	—	—	—	—	—
2025–26	Henderson Silver Knights	AHL	64	4	7	11	33	—	—	—	—	—
2025–26	Vegas Golden Knights	NHL	4	0	0	0	2	—	—	—	—	—
NHL totals			197	4	23	27	77	—	—	—	—	—

=== International ===
Year	Team	Event	Result	GP	G	A	Pts	PIM
2022	United States	WC	4th	8	0	2	2	4
Senior totals				8	0	2	2	4

Sporting positions
Preceded by Jake Bischoff	Henderson Silver Knights captain 2025–present	Incumbent
