= Henderson Pavilion =

Former amphitheater in Henderson, Nevada, U.S

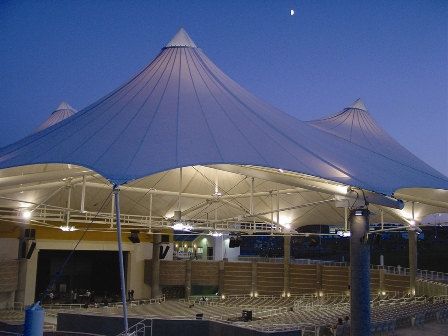
- Exterior of venue (c. 2013)

- Location in Nevada Location in the United States Location in North America
- Interactive map of Henderson Pavilion
- Address: 200 South Green Valley Parkway
- Location: Henderson, Nevada, U.S.
- Coordinates: 36.01924°N 115.0814°W
- Owner: City of Henderson
- Operator: City of Henderson Parks & Recreation
- Capacity: 6,587
- Type: Outdoor amphitheater

Construction
- Opened: September 27, 2002; 24 years ago
- Demolished: August 24, 2020; 6 years ago

The Henderson Pavilion was an amphitheater in Henderson, Nevada, used primarily for music performances. It opened on September 27, 2002. The project was funded through a parks and recreation bond approved by voters in 1997.

The Henderson Pavilion was known for its 40,000-square-foot (3,700 m^{2}) canopy style roof. This allowed for the feeling of both being inside and outdoors at the same time.

The Henderson Pavilion was the largest open-air amphitheater in Nevada and the first of its kind in Southern Nevada.

The Henderson Pavilion was owned by the City of Henderson and was the home of the Henderson Symphony Orchestra, and the host of many of musical events each year.

It was located at 200 South Green Valley Parkway, Henderson, Nevada 89012, south of the I-215 freeway and Green Valley Ranch.

The box office was located inside the Henderson Multigenerational Center just adjacent to the venue at 250 South Green Valley Parkway.

The pavilion was torn down on August 24, 2020 and replaced by the Dollar Loan Center, now Lee's Family Forum, which houses the Henderson Silver Knights of the American Hockey League, affiliate of the Vegas Golden Knights of the National Hockey League.

== See also ==
- List of contemporary amphitheatres
