= Nicole Johnson (monster truck driver) =

American professional monster truck driver

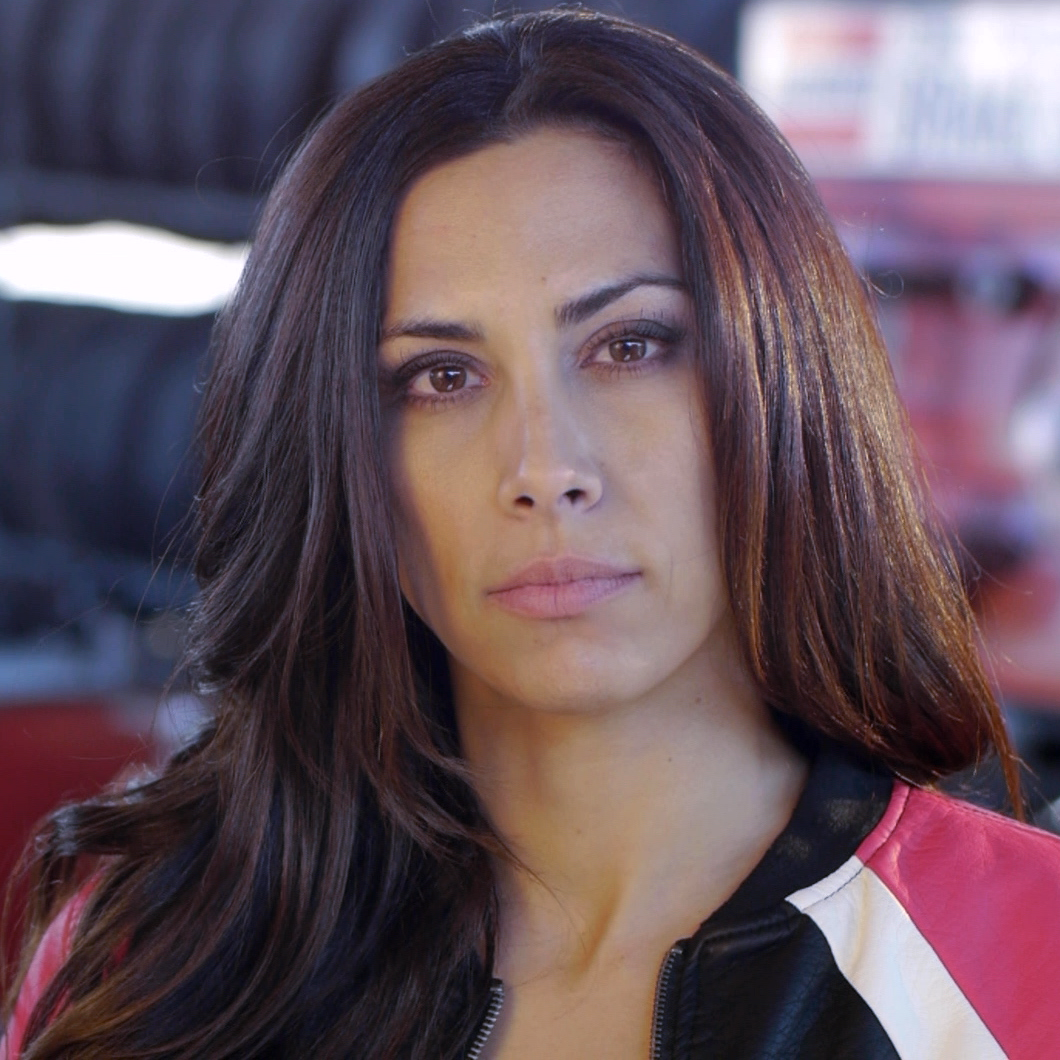

Personal information
- Nationality: American
- Born: Nicole Michelle Jardin; January 16, 1974 (age 52) Ventura County, California, U.S.
- Education: Brigham Young University
- Spouse: Frank Johnson

Sport
- Country: United States
- Sport: Monster Jam
- Team: Scooby-Doo
- Retired: 2017

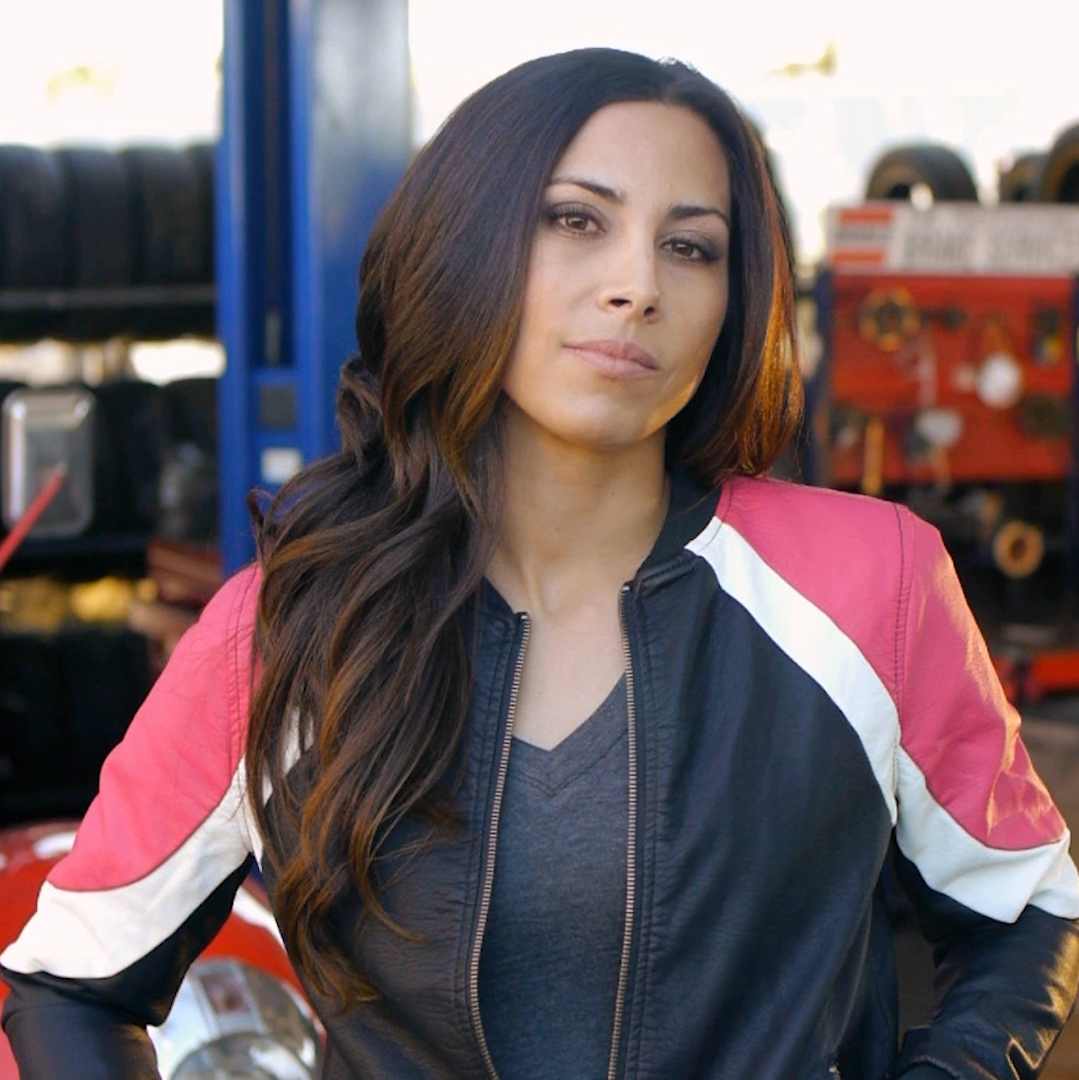

Nicole Michelle Johnson (born January 16, 1974) is an American professional monster truck driver, competition rock crawler and YouTube personality. Born in Oxnard, California, and residing in Las Vegas, Nevada, the mother of two boys was the original driver of the Scooby-Doo Monster Jam truck, which is owned and operated by Feld Motorsports, a division of Feld Entertainment. The YouTube channel Nicole Johnson's Detour published its first episode in 2021, which received 2 million views in its first 30 days.

== Life and career ==
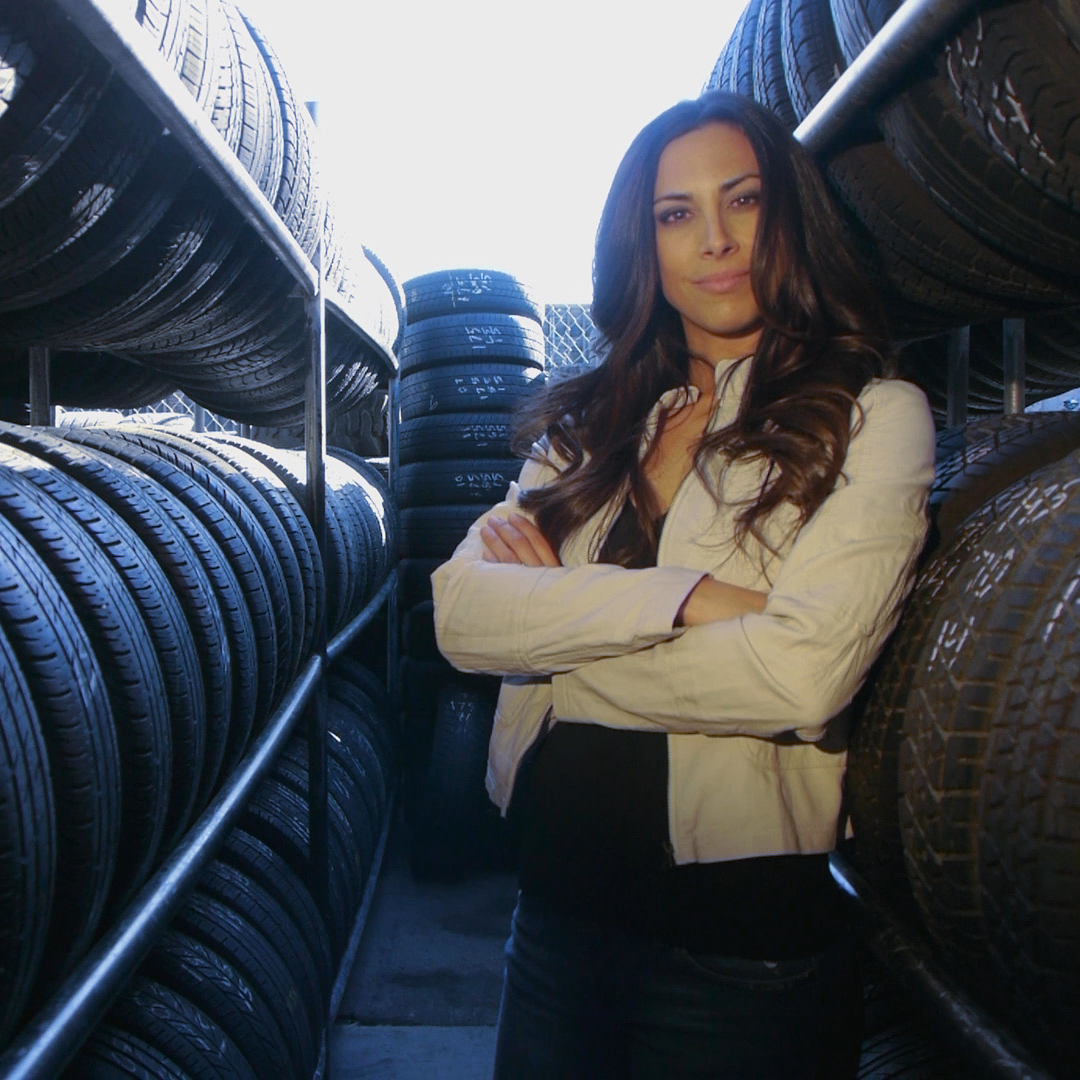

=== Early years ===
Born Nicole Michelle Jardin on January 16, 1974, in Oxnard, California to parents Thomas and Georgia who divorced when she was young, Nicole spent weekends and summers in Hawaii with her father, who was a diesel mechanic by trade. She was often around cars and learned mechanics from her dad, who had her driving a go-kart powered by a Briggs and Stratton lawn mower engine when she was five years old.

Johnson is a convert to the Church of Jesus Christ of Latter-day Saints and graduated from Brigham Young University with a Bachelor of Science degree in construction management in 1996.

At age 19, Johnson married Frank Ralph Johnson on August 14, 1993, in Los Angeles, CA. The number 814, representing their anniversary, was later used as the couple's team number at rock crawling competitions. The couple moved to Las Vegas after graduation in 1996, and have resided there ever since. Nicole and Frank have two sons.

=== Off Road career ===
As a young couple, Nicole and Frank often spent weekends four wheeling in their 1972 Toyota Land Cruiser. Avid four wheelers since the beginning of their marriage, Nicole served as Treasurer of the Southern Nevada Landcruiser Association, the Las Vegas-based chapter of the Toyota Landcruiser Association, in 1997 to 1998, alongside Frank who served as the organization's President. In 2001, Frank became a spotter for the Red Bull Rock Crawling team and Nicole cheered him from the sidelines. By 2004, in her first competition, Nicole drove a friend's vehicle at the Pro Rock Women's National Championships, spotted by Frank. The couple placed first at the event, which sparked the creation of their rock crawling team together, known as Johnson Motorsports.

In 2007, Nicole turned pro and competed through 2010 in the Pro Modified class at the World Extreme Rock Crawling Competition Series (known as W.E. Rock). From 2008 through 2010, she raced King of the Hammers. In 2008, she became the first female finisher of the race, was awarded "Fastest Queen" for her finish in 2010. Nicole also raced a partial season in 2010 at the Lucas Oil Off Road Racing Series in the Limited Buggy class. In 2008, Nicole and Frank were featured on Modern Marvels on the History Channel. At the 2010 SEMA Show, Nicole met monster truck legend Dennis Anderson, creator of Grave Digger Monster Truck, and his son, Ryan Anderson, who introduced her to Feld Entertainment personnel. Two weeks after meeting the Andersons, in November 2010, Nicole test drove a monster truck and accepted the job with Monster Jam, which began six weeks later.

Nicole joined Monster Jam in January 2011 driving Tasmanian Devil, a 1,475 horsepower monster truck based around the Warner Brothers cartoon character of the same name. She made Monster Jam history in Trenton, NJ on January 7, 2011, as the first female rookie driver to win racing in a debut performance. During the same ten-week season, she won racing nine times, breaking the record for the most racing wins in a single season by a rookie or a female. By the end of her rookie year in 2011, Nicole was honored as the recipient of the Monster Jam Rising Star Driver Award and was a nominee for the 2011 Monster Jam Rookie of the Year Award.

Scheduled to continue a second season in Tasmanian Devil, by January, 2012, Nicole was selected to pilot Advance Auto Parts Grinder, a truck representing Monster Jam's title sponsor, when its regular driver, Frank Krmel, was injured pre-season. Nicole filled in for five weeks, then returned to Tasmanian Devil for the remainder of the 2012 season. At the March, 2012 Monster Jam World Finals held in Las Vegas, NV, Nicole was one of eight drivers selected to race the inaugural Young Guns Shootout and returned to her seat in Grinder. Nicole was defeated in the final round of racing by Bari Musawwir, driver of Spider-Man.

By January 2013, Nicole had become one of the "most enthusiastic and popular Monster Jam drivers" and was selected to pilot and debut the Warner Bros. Consumer Products Scooby-Doo Monster Jam truck. At the 2013 Monster Jam Awards Ceremony, Nicole was presented with the Crash Madness of the Year Award for a racing wreck, in which she was uninjured, earlier in the season in New Orleans, LA at the Mercedes-Benz Superdome.

At the 2014 Monster Jam World Finals in Las Vegas, NV, Nicole became the first female to land the backflip in Monster Jam competition while driving Scooby-Doo.
