= Lee's Discount Liquor =

Chain of liquor stores in Nevada

- Industry: Alcohol
- Founded: 1981; 45 years ago in the Las Vegas Valley
- Founder: Hae Un Lee
- Headquarters: Henderson, Nevada, United States
- Number of locations: 22 (2017)
- Area served: Nevada
- Key people: Kenny Lee (president and later CEO)
- Owner: Lee family
- Number of employees: 185 (2011)
- Website: leesdiscountliquor.com

Lee's Discount Liquor is a chain of liquor stores in Nevada. It was founded by Hae Un Lee in 1981, and is the largest liquor retailer in the state, with 22 locations as of 2017. Besides the Las Vegas Valley and Reno, the company also has stores in Mesquite and West Wendover, two locations that are popular with residents of nearby Utah, where alcohol laws are more strict. The company is known for its humorous advertising, which often featured Hae Un Lee and his son Kenny Lee, who respectively are chief executive officer and president for the company. Hae Un Lee died of pancreatic cancer in 2021, and Kenny Lee took over as CEO, until his death in a car crash less than three months later.

== History ==
=== Early years ===
Lee's Discount Liquor was founded by Hae Un Lee, who immigrated to the United States from South Korea in 1980. Lee received a loan from a relative and used it to help finance a Las Vegas liquor store business, which he opened in 1981. With $100,000, Lee opened the 1,200 sq ft (110 m^{2}) store, Plaza Liquor, on the corner of Spring Mountain Road and Jones Boulevard. Lee later changed the name to A Plaza Liquor so it would be listed first in the local phone book. When Lee extended the name to A Plaza Liquor Barn, a California chain with a similar name threatened to sue him, ultimately leading to the name Lee's Discount Liquor. Lee operated one of the few standalone liquor stores in Las Vegas, where most packaged alcohol was sold in supermarkets.

Lee had gotten the idea to open a liquor store after buying a bottle of Scotch whiskey in Las Vegas. At the time, Lee did not know how to speak English, and the cashier did not say anything to him when he purchased the whiskey. Lee later said, "I went to buy a bottle of Johnny Walker Black Label, and the (sales clerk) said nothing to me. I spoke zero (English). So (I decided) 'This is my business.'" Lee soon realized through experience that there would be customers who ask him questions about the alcohol products. He had difficulty helping such customers to locate specific products in the store, although he worked to improve his English, as well as his knowledge about the liquor business.

Lee made only $875 in the first month, and the first year of revenue brought in less than $50,000. According to Lee's son Kenny, "(He) didn't know what he was doing, and modeled it after stores in Los Angeles that not only carried liquor but other items, almost a convenience store." Hae Un Lee decided to promote the store in response to the poor revenue. The store received promotion through advertisements on vans, as well as flyers that were left door-to-door and also passed out by Lee's children. Lee also promoted the store through newspaper advertisements.

Lee learned from a friend about a liquor store in Denver, and he flew there to learn how the business was operated. In Denver, Lee was advised to change his store format to focus on discount liquor. Lee realized how successful his store could be when monthly revenues increased to $30,000 within a year and a half of its opening. Lee said he worked hard to ensure the store would be successful. He worked seven days a week and operated it largely by himself. Lee would work overnight shifts as a bellhop, go home to sleep for three hours, and then open his liquor store for a 12-hour shift. At some point, Lee also worked late-night shifts as a busboy for a casino in downtown Las Vegas, while operating the liquor store during the day, taking naps under the store counter at times.

=== Expansion ===
A second liquor store was opened in 1984. Spirits were the most successful product for Lee's during the 1980s, and the business later updated its selection to include premium liquors for wealthy customers. In 1989, Lee purchased his first store building to eliminate the lease, making for a bigger profit. The majority of future store locations were also owned entirely by the Lee family rather than leased. Lee's son, Kenny Lee, started working for the company in 1992, first as a store stocker and later as a cashier, before becoming a vice president six years later. Hae Un Lee was closely involved in the development of new store locations and would learn about the area surrounding potential sites, including the number of nearby homes, average income, and other demographics. By 1996, the company had three store locations.

In 1997, alcohol retailer BevMo! opened two locations in Las Vegas to compete against Lee's, which opened two more stores in response and expanded its alcohol selection. After a year and a half, BevMo! closed its locations in Las Vegas. Lee's grew to become a major retailer of alcohol in the Las Vegas Valley, with its biggest competitors consisting of Costco, Sam's Club, and supermarkets. Lee's developed a reputation for its low prices and large variety of products, including some obscure alcohols. There was some consideration to changing the name to Lee's Wine and Spirits, although Hae Un Lee insisted on keeping the current name to market the chain as a discount retailer. Lee later said, "Here in the United States, people like discounts, Discount Tires, etc." Lee's became a frequent recipient of the "Best of Las Vegas" award, given out by the Las Vegas Review-Journal.

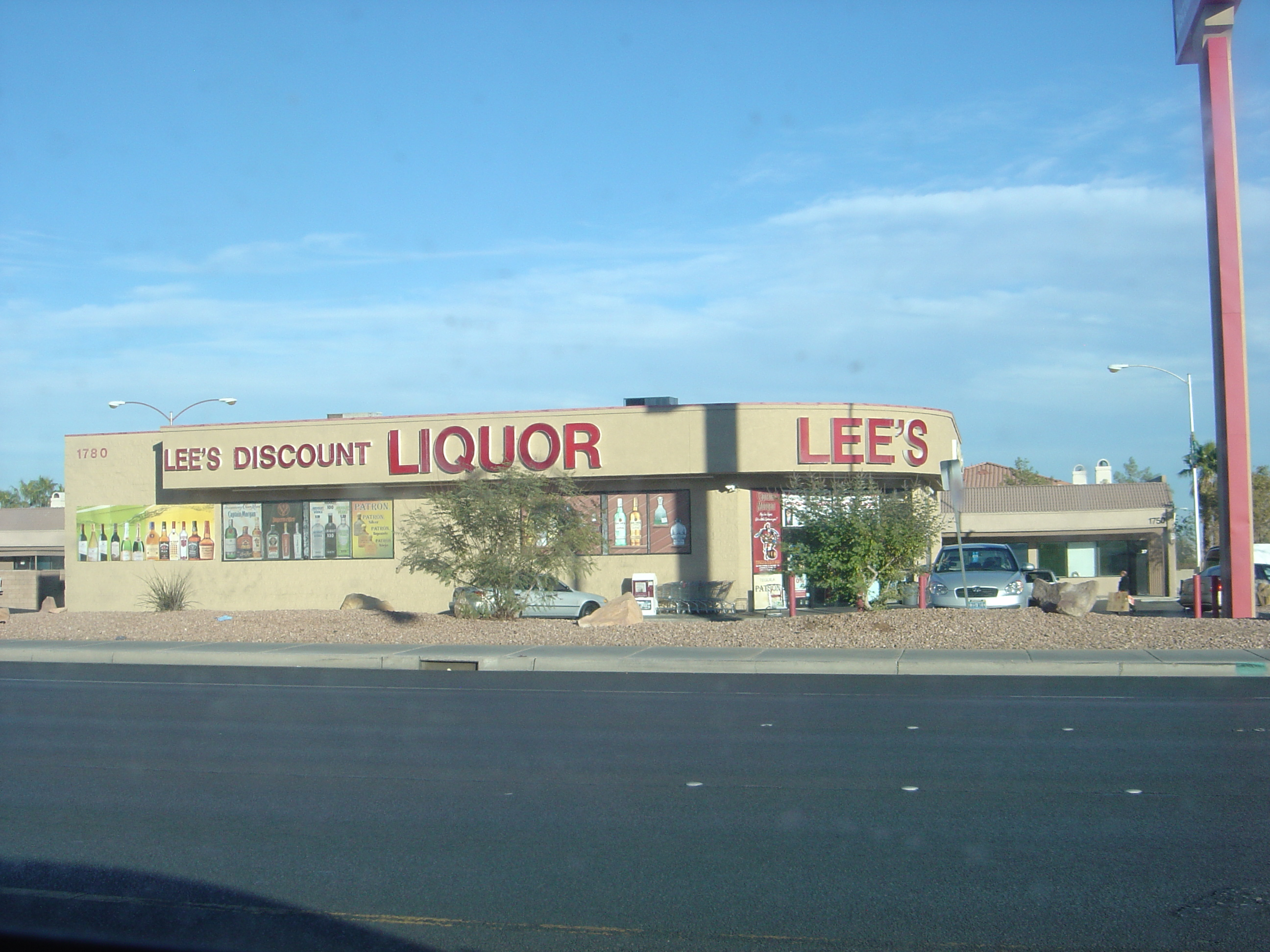
A Lee's Discount Liquor store

In 2003, Lee's began holding free wine-tasting events in its stores as part of its popular wine club. The first tasting included the presence of Andrew Firestone, a reality television star. Lee's subsequently introduced a beer-tasting event. As of 2004, Lee's had eight locations in the Las Vegas Valley, with a 29,000 sq ft (2,700 m^{2}) store in Henderson also serving as the company headquarters. The store offered 1,600 different products, including beer, spirits, and wine.

As of 2006, Lee still worked seven days a week. He said Las Vegas was a difficult place to operate a liquor store for several reasons, including competition from grocery stores and bars. In addition, Clark County, Nevada has laws which prohibit liquor stores from operating within 1,500 feet of schools, churches, and other businesses with a liquor license. At the time, Lee operated nine of the 45 liquor stores located in the Las Vegas Valley, and Lee's Discount Liquor had become the largest alcohol retailer in Nevada. Lee attributed his success to repeat customers, a large selection of products, and large stores which allowed him to buy products in bulk. A 12,000 sq ft (1,100 m^{2}) Lee's Discount Liquor store opened in Mesquite, Nevada in 2006. It became popular among residents in nearby Utah, where alcohol laws are more strict.

In 2010, McCarran International Airport sought to open a liquor store in its facility for additional revenue, during a period of poor economic conditions. Lee's was chosen to operate the store, which would be called Lee's Runway Liquor and would share revenue with the airport. Lee's had until the end of 2011 to begin construction on the store, but it ultimately did not proceed because of disagreements about the proposed partnership with the airport. As of 2011, Lee's had 185 employees, and Kenny Lee had become the company president. In 2012, Kenny Lee took over daily operations of the 17 store locations, although his father remained involved in the business as well.

In April 2016, a Lee's cashier was shot and killed during a store robbery, and three men were subsequently arrested for their involvement. Two of the suspects received prison sentences, while prosecutors sought the death penalty for the third suspect, who was convicted on all charges.

As of 2016, Hae Un Lee had no plans of retiring from his position as the company's chief executive officer. Later that year, construction began on a new Lee's Discount Liquor location in West Wendover, Nevada, near the Utah border. It opened the following year, marking the company's first location in northern Nevada. The store is 30,000 sq ft (2,800 m^{2}) and offers more than 6,000 products. Like the Mesquite store, it attracts buyers from Utah, where alcohol prices had recently been increased by the state's Department of Alcoholic Beverage Control. Kenny Lee said, "Utah is all state-run and priced so outrageously that people will drive to stock up." The Mesquite store was one of the company's most successful locations. At the time, Lee's remained as the largest liquor retailer in Nevada, with 22 locations. The stores are owned by various members of the Lee family. Stores range from 5,000 to 31,000 square feet, with the average store being around 16,000.

In 2019, Lee's opened its first store in Reno, Nevada, a 20,000 square foot store on the north side of town. A second store was added in south Reno in late 2019. Hae Un Lee died of pancreatic cancer in August 2021. Kenny Lee took over as chief executive officer, but died in a car crash less than three months later. Kenny's wife, Nami Lee, is now the CEO of the company.

== Advertising ==
Lee's Discount Liquor is known for its humorous advertising, which consists of print ads, commercials, and billboards throughout the Las Vegas Valley. Some commercials and billboards feature Lee and his son Kenny, who said, "We are goofy, funny and a little edgy." Hae Un Lee and his son got the idea to do the commercials in 2002, after seeing a commercial for another father-son business in Minnesota that belonged to the same guild as the Lees. Kenny Lee said, "It's almost like we're cheesy local celebrities. But my dad gets a kick out of it." Dan Aykroyd and Mike Ditka have also appeared in Lee's commercials to promote their alcohol brands.

Lee's advertisements often feature jokes relating to alcohol; they have received some criticism. In 2013, several billboard advertisements became controversial for their message, "Alcohol: it's cheaper than therapy." A Change.org petition was started by a group who believed that the billboards encouraged people with alcohol addiction to drink more, rather than to seek therapy. Hae Un Lee did not believe the ads were funny, while Kenny Lee said, "I thought they were funny and goes well with our television commercials, but didn't realize the people it would affect." Kenny Lee later said, "There's always going to be people who don't like our ads. When KLUC did an online poll about us, 85% of the people said that they knew we were just joking around. When you are in a city where you have mobile billboards with half-naked girls, it's hard to believe that people would give us trouble for the stuff that we put on our signs."

In April 2024, the company acquired the naming rights to The Dollar Loan Center, a sports arena in Henderson, renaming it Lee's Family Forum in honor of Hae Un and Kenny Lee.
