= Orange Soda (song) =

2019 single by Baby Keem

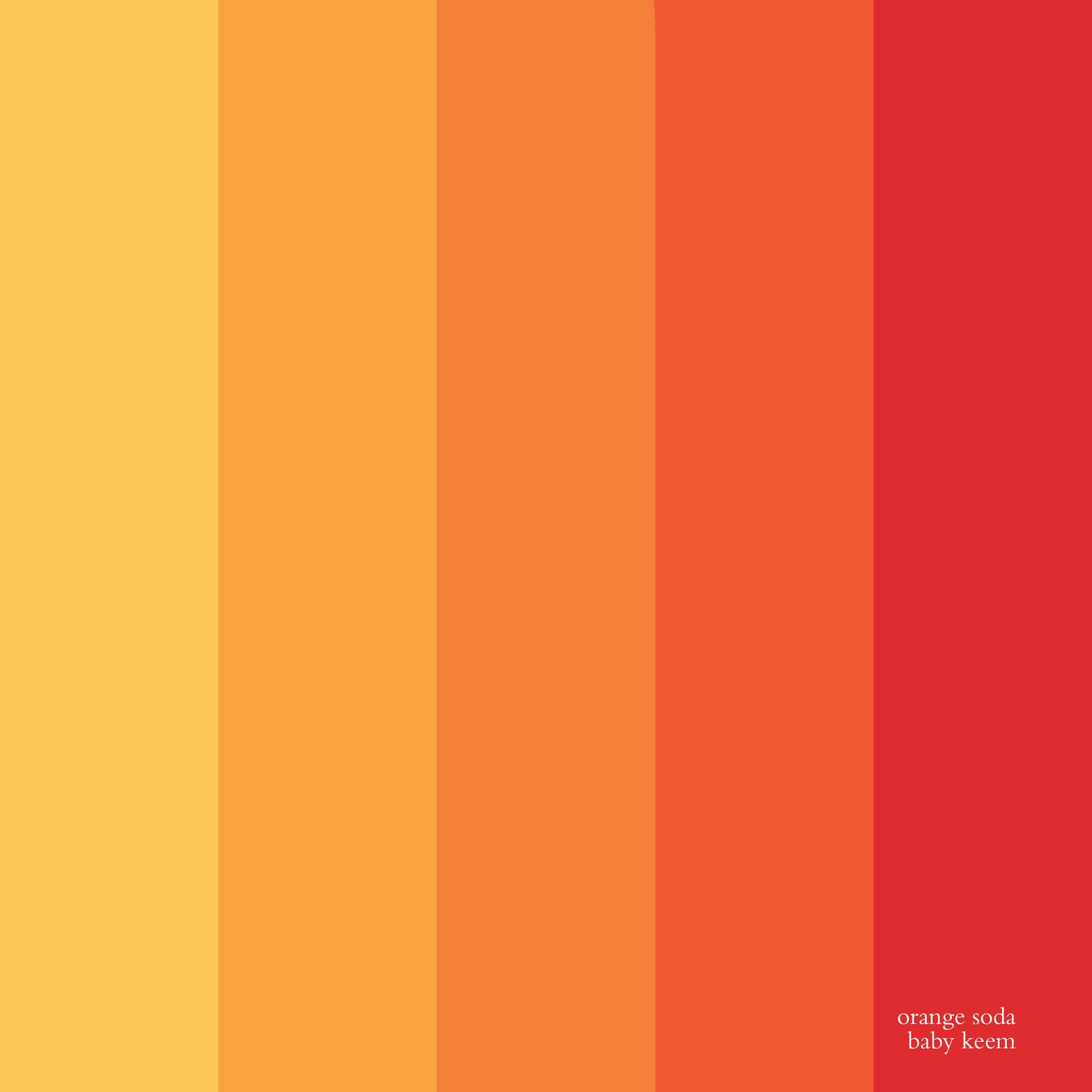

Single by Baby Keem

from the album Die for My Bitch
- Released: July 16, 2019
- Length: 2:09
- Label: The Orchard; Sony; Columbia
- Songwriters: Hykeem Carter, Jr.; Keanu Torres
- Producers: Baby Keem; Keanu Beats

Baby Keem singles chronology
| "France Freestyle" (2019) | "Orange Soda" (2019) | "Hooligan" / "Sons & Critics Freestyle" (2020) |

Music video
- "Orange Soda" on YouTube

"Orange Soda" (stylized in all caps) is a song by American rapper Baby Keem. It was released on July 16, 2019 as the lead single from his second mixtape Die for My Bitch. The song was produced by Baby Keem himself, alongside Keanu Beats. The song was a sleeper hit, becoming Baby Keem's first song to chart on the US Billboard Hot 100, entering at number 98 in January 2020.

== Critical reception ==
In naming Die for My Bitch one of the 50 best hip hop projects of 2019, P.A.B. of XXL called the track "ethereal", noting that Keem "injects melody and hilarious boasts into tracks" with his "lithe vocals".

== Music video ==
A music video for the track was released on November 13, 2019. It was filmed in New York City and directed by Dave Free.

== Other versions ==
The song was remixed by American rapper Rich the Kid, released in February 2020.

== Charts ==
Chart performance for "Orange Soda"
| Chart (2020) | Peak position |
|---|---|
| Canada (Canadian Hot 100) | 100 |
| US Billboard Hot 100 | 98 |
| US Hot R&B/Hip-Hop Songs (Billboard) | 47 |
| US Rhythmic (Billboard) | 38 |
| US Rolling Stone Top 100 | 81 |

== Certifications ==
Certifications for "Orange Soda"
| Region | Certification | Certified units/sales |
|---|---|---|
| New Zealand (RMNZ) | Platinum | 30,000^{‡} |
| United Kingdom (BPI) | Gold | 400,000^{‡} |
| United States (RIAA) | 4× Platinum | 4,000,000^{‡} |
^{‡} Sales+streaming figures based on certification alone.
