= The Trash Mermaids =

Pop rock music group

The Trash Mermaids is an electropop and pop rock music group fronted by French vocalist Scarlett Blu.

== Career ==
The Trash Mermaids is an electropop and pop rock musical group led by Scarlett Blu, who is the creative director, songwriter, and lead singer for the group. In 2017 the group released the album Evil Twin. The first single from the album was “Cryptic Love”, which Blu wrote while scuba diving in Tonga. The track ranked on the Billboard Dance Club Songs chart, reaching number fourteen. The second song released from the album is “Xperiel”, which also charted on the Billboard Dance Club Songs chart from April to June 2018, reaching number twenty.
