= Joe Muscaglione =

Joseph S. Muscaglione (born February 28, 1963, in Passaic, New Jersey), is a food and wine gourmand, chef and sommelier. Having started in the restaurant business as a teenager, by age 21 he created one of New Jersey's most eclectic wine lists, at award-winning Foro Italico Restaurant. At Foro Italico, the Wine Spectator Magazine awarded its wine list with the "Award of Excellence" 6 years in a row. Muscaglione has been featured in the Wine Spectator Magazine, The Bergen Record and The New York Times. In an NY Times article written on October 21, 2001, writer David Corcoran states "Be sure to spend some quality time with Foro Italico's wine guy, Joseph Muscaglione."
