= Matthew Callister =

American politician (born 1955)

Matthew Q. Callister

Member of the Las Vegas City Council from Ward 4
- In office 1995–1997
- Mayor: Jan Laverty Jones

Member of the Nevada Senate from the 8th district
- In office November 1992 – January 12, 1995
- Succeeded by: O.C. Lee

Member of the Nevada Assembly from the Clark County No. 1 district
- In office November 1986 – November 1992

Personal details
- Born: Matthew Q. Callister Las Vegas, Nevada, U.S.
- Party: Democratic
- Children: 5

Matthew Q. Callister (born December 5, 1955) is a former American Democratic politician who served as a Las Vegas city councilman (1995–1997), a Nevada state senator (1992–1995), and a Nevada state assemblyman (1986–1992).

== Biography ==
Callister was born in Las Vegas, Nevada. He graduated from Ed W. Clark High School. He served a mission for The Church of Jesus Christ of Latter-day Saints in Corpus Christi, Texas from 1974 to 1976. Callister earned a bachelor's degree in political science from the University of Utah in 1978, and a juris doctor degree from the University of San Diego School of Law in 1981.

Callister worked as a law clerk for U.S. Senator Paul Laxalt. After passing the Nevada bar exam, he joined his father's law firm, Callister & Reynolds, as a partner before entering politics.

Callister served as a member of the Clark County General Obligation Bond Commission, City of Las Vegas Liquor/Tavern License Commission, Clark County Regional Jail Commission, and Southern Nevada Water Authority.

== Committees ==
- Senate Finance Committee
- Assembly Ways and Means Committee, chair (two terms)
