= D'manti =

- Born: Danielle Diamond; Las Vegas, Nevada
- Genres: Dance-pop
- Occupations: Singer, songwriter, actress, dancer, producer
- Instruments: Vocals, saxophone
- Website: www.dmanti.com

D'manti is an American singer and songwriter who was born and raised in Las Vegas, Nevada. According to the singer, D'Manti means "sparkling diamond", although the literal translation from Italian means "many capes.”

== Biography ==
D’Manti began to perform at a young age. She appeared in a variety of theatre productions, television shows and independent films such as "Soul Savior Chronicles," “Honolulu Knights," “Johnathan Gullible Rottingham,"“Seeking Rainbows,"“Blind Trust" and "Man's World.”

D’Manti served in the United States Marines.

== Music ==
D'manti later began to concentrate on music, releasing a collection of original up-beat songs. D'manti's debut single "Tonight", a pop-dance fusion, peaked at No. 15 on the Billboard Club Play charts. The debut single also received notoriety on the FMQB Record Pool charts claiming the No. 13 slot and entered at No. 40 on the National Dance/Crossover charts. "Tonight" peaked at No. 2 on the Most Added Dance/Crossover Tracks chart for the week ending October 3. "Tonight" was produced by Luny Tunes and features remixes from Mixin Marc & Tony Svejda, WAWA, DJ Mike Cruz and Smash Mode.

D'manti's latest release, "Let's Just Dance" peaked in early August 2013 at # 5 on the Billboard Club Play charts.

== Featured films ==
- Soul Savior Chronicles: Memphet
- Honolulu Knights: Eva
- Johnathan Gullible: Rottingham
- Seeking Rainbows: Workout Woman 1
- Blind Trust: Blind Woman
- Man's World: Prostitute

== Theatre Presentations ==
- Taxi Tales: Mandi/Joanna/Gigi
- All in the Timing: Betty/Waitress

== Television ==
D'manti was featured in the following television shows:

- Salsa and the City: Salsa Dancer
- Total Body Sculpt by Gilad: Workout girl
- Kama'aina Dance Party: Co-Hostess/Dancer

== Discography ==
- Superstar
- Freeze
- Dime lo que Quiero/ Tell Me What I Want
- Candela
- Kandy Girl
- Tonight
- Don't Stop/No Pares
- Love Thief
- Me Siento Latina
- Baby Boy
- Shake
- Diversity
- 2012
- Put Your Drinks Up
- Yo Soy/ I am
