= Hae Un Lee =

Korean-American businessman (1942–2021)

Hae Un Lee 이해언
- Lee in 2011
- Born: June 27, 1942; Jecheon, Chūseihoku-dō, Korea, Empire of Japan
- Died: August 27, 2021 (aged 79); Las Vegas, Nevada, U.S.
- Other name: Hae Lee
- Education: Dongguk University
- Occupation: Businessman
- Known for: Lee's Discount Liquor
- Spouse: Sun Ja Lee
- Children: 3

Korean name
- Hangul: 이해언
- Hanja: 李海彦
- RR: I Haeeon
- MR: I Haeŏn

Hae Un Lee (Korean: 이해언; June 27, 1942 – August 27, 2021) was a Korean-born American businessman and the chief executive officer of Lee's Discount Liquor, which he founded in Nevada in 1981, after immigrating to the United States from South Korea a year earlier. By 2006, the company had become the largest alcohol retailer in Nevada. As of 2017, it operated 22 locations statewide. Lee was a well known philanthropist in his hometown of Las Vegas, where he also owned the Koreatown Plaza shopping center.

== Early life ==
Hae Un Lee was born in Jecheon, Chūseihoku-dō (North Chungcheong Province), Korea, Empire of Japan in 1942. He was educated at Dongguk University in South Korea, where he received a degree in economics and a graduate degree in business.

== Career ==
During the 1970s, Lee worked in Seoul for ten years at the Ministry of Health and Social Affairs, as an investigator of drug traffickers. Dissatisfied with Seoul's overpopulation and its poor education for his children, Lee decided to move his family to the United States in 1980. He stayed with relatives who lived in Las Vegas, although he did not intend to live there permanently. A friend had already persuaded Lee to work as a dry cleaner in New York, but Lee disliked the job and returned to Las Vegas after a month. Lee was depressed that he could only get menial and temporary jobs, the result of not knowing how to speak English.

=== Lee's Discount Liquor ===
In 1981, Lee opened a liquor store in the Las Vegas Valley called Plaza Liquor, which would later develop into a chain of stores called Lee's Discount Liquor. Initially, Lee operated one of the few standalone liquor stores in Las Vegas, where most packaged alcohol was sold in supermarkets. Lee said he worked hard to ensure the liquor store would be successful. He worked seven days a week and operated the store largely by himself. Lee would work overnight shifts as a bellhop, go home to sleep for three hours, and then open his liquor store for a 12-hour shift. At some point, Lee also worked late-night shifts as a busboy for a casino in downtown Las Vegas, while operating the liquor store during the day, taking naps under the store counter at times. Lee's Discount Liquor grew to become a major retailer of alcohol in the Las Vegas Valley.

As of 2006, Lee still worked seven days a week. He considered Las Vegas a difficult place to operate a liquor store because of strict laws, as well as competition from grocery stores and bars. At the time, Lee operated nine of the 45 liquor stores located in the Las Vegas Valley, and Lee's Discount Liquor had become the largest alcohol retailer in Nevada. In 2012, his son Kenny Lee took over daily operations of the company's 17 store locations, although Hae Un Lee maintained some involvement in the business. As of 2016, Hae Un Lee had no plans of retiring from his position as chief executive officer. Lee's remained as the largest liquor retailer in Nevada, with 22 locations.

=== Other ventures ===
In 1992, Lee was the president of the local Korean Association, and he asked businessman James Yu to help operate it with him. In 2006, Lee helped organize plans for a new local bank, First Asian Bank, which would serve Asian entrepreneurs. Lee and Yu were among the board members for the bank, which opened in 2007. Lee's Tavern, a sports bar and steak house, opened in Mesquite during the same year.

When Lee moved to Las Vegas in 1980, there were only a few small Korean grocery stores and restaurants in the city. Lee wanted to expand the local Korean culture. In 2006, Lee and Yu purchased an old Albertsons building and strip mall with plans to renovate it into an Asian shopping center known as Koreatown Plaza, located on Spring Mountain Road near Las Vegas' Chinatown. The project was delayed over the next two years because of construction and asbestos issues. It opened in January 2009. A 30,000 sq ft (2,800 m^{2}) Korean grocery store opened as the anchor tenant later that year, through a lease with Lee. Koreatown Plaza, located on 10 acres, has 900,000 sq ft (84,000 m^{2}) of space, including a 200-seat food court. The shopping center has been used as an event space for the Asian community.

In January 2012, the Lee family opened a restaurant, Woonam Jung, at Koreatown Plaza. An earlier tenant was to operate the eatery, but the deal did not work out, leaving the Lees to renovate and open the restaurant themselves with help from a Korean chef who would manage it. The restaurant later became known as Lee's Korean BBQ.

Aside from Lee's Discount Liquor, Lee also owned another alcohol retailer, Strip Liquor, a higher-priced store located on the Las Vegas Strip with tourists as the target clientele.

== Personal life and philanthropy ==
Lee was married to Sun Ja Lee; the couple has three children and eight grandchildren. As of 2007, Lee was a Republican. He had previously been a Democrat. Lee was actively involved in local politics. In 2014, Lee and his wife purchased a $20,000 table for a UNLV Foundation fundraising dinner, with Hillary Clinton giving the keynote address.

In 2015, an 87-year-old, longtime employee of Lee filed an age discrimination lawsuit against him, alleging that he had continually mocked her old age before she was eventually demoted and later fired.

Lee was a well-known local philanthropist and had a nonprofit organization, Lee's Helping Hand, which assisted other organizations such as Lou Ruvo Center for Brain Health and Spread the Word. Lee's Beer & Tequila Experience and Lee's Wine Experience are annual fundraisers which raise money for Lee's Helping Hand, which would donate $100,000 every year to charities. Lee's Wine Experience offers hundreds of wines for tasting. Lee's Discount Liquor also helped other Asian businesses through the Las Vegas Asian Chamber of Commerce, and by 2011 had donated more than $150,000 to local children's charities and other causes over the past decade. As of 2016, Lee's Helping Hand had contributed more than $800,000 to charities in Las Vegas. In 2018, Lee donated to a food drive held at Koreatown Plaza. Lee also frequently donated money and turkeys to Catholic Charities USA for Thanksgiving meals.

Lee received several awards and honors. In 2002, Market Watch Magazine named Lee as retailer of the year. In 2005, the Nevada district office of the Small Business Administration named Lee as small businessperson of the year for the Asian Chamber of Commerce. In 2013, he was honored by the Las Vegas Business Academy during its second annual scholarship fundraising dinner. Up to that time, Lee and his wife had contributed more than $200,000 to local children's charities. Lee received a Dom Pérignon Award of Excellence at the 45th UNLVino wine and food festival, held in 2019.

Lee's life has been cited as an example of living the American Dream, and he has praised the United States as a fair country and the best in the world. He said in 2007 that he had no desire to return to South Korea, and that he could not have built a large and successful business there as he did in the U.S. He enjoyed golfing as a hobby.

== Illness and death ==
Lee was diagnosed with pancreatic cancer in October 2020, and died on August 27, 2021, at the age of 79. Son Kenny Lee took over as chief executive officer of Lee's Discount Liquor. He died in a car crash, three months later, at the age of 53. He had not been wearing a seatbelt and was ejected from the vehicle. A toxicology report found his blood alcohol level to be nearly three times the legal limit.
