= Kendrick Lamar videography =

Recordings by American rapper and songwriter

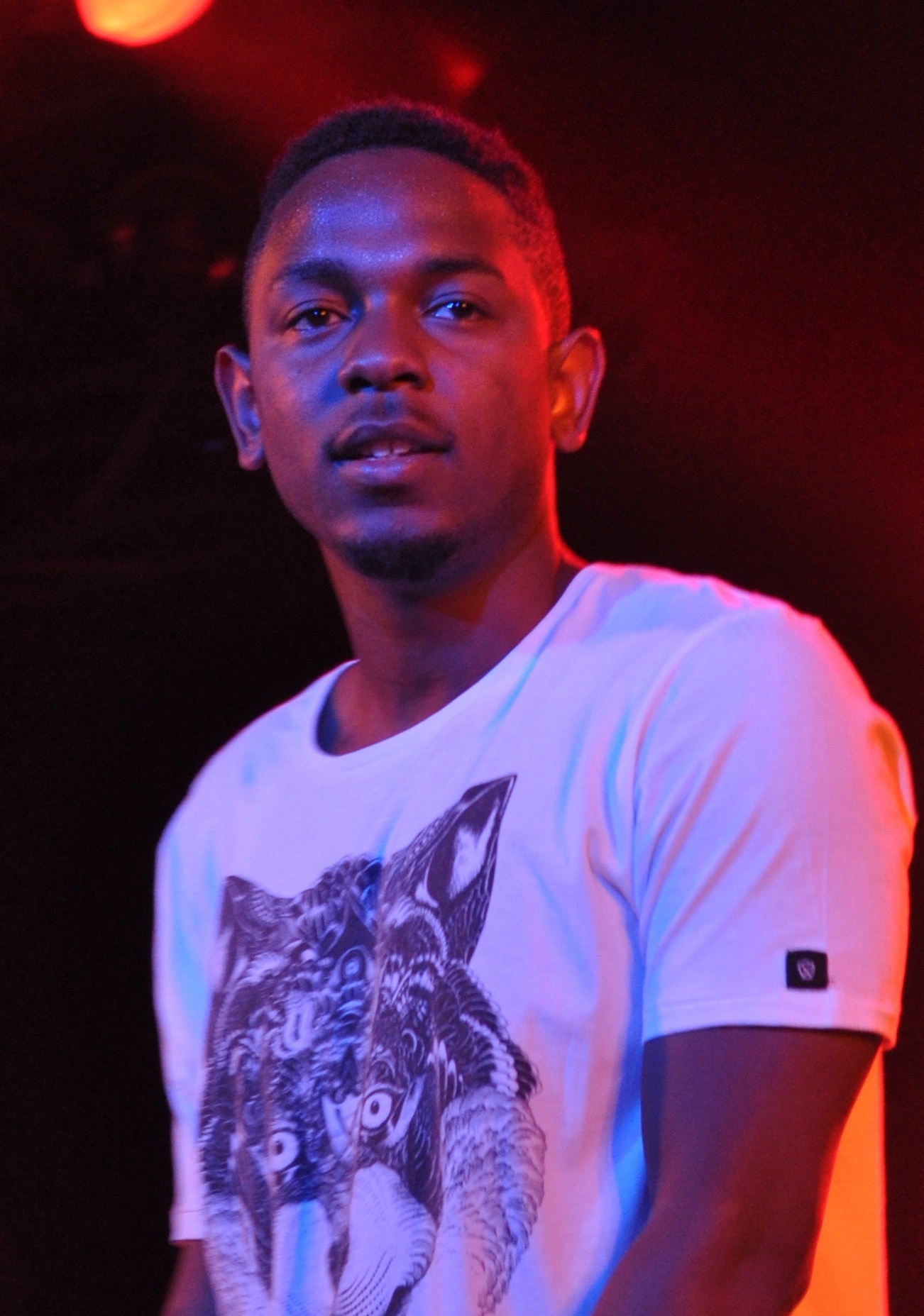
Kendrick Lamar performing in Hamburg in 2013

American rapper Kendrick Lamar has appeared in 74 music videos, 17 of which he directed with his creative partner Dave Free. (Note: 12 of the music videos are credited under The Little Homies, Lamar and Free's filmmaking alias from 2013 to 2018.) He was featured in several documentaries, helmed three short films, and released one concert film.

For his debut studio album, Section.80 (2011), Lamar worked with directors such as Vashtie Kola to release four music videos, including visuals for "HiiiPower" and "A.D.H.D". His second album, Good Kid, M.A.A.D City (2012), was supported by music videos for "Swimming Pools (Drank)", "Backseat Freestyle" (Lamar's music video directorial debut), "Poetic Justice", "Bitch, Don't Kill My Vibe", and "Sing About Me". He also starred in and produced a companion short film, which was directed by Khalil Joseph. Lamar and Free began receiving recognition for their directorial work with Lamar's third studio album, To Pimp a Butterfly (2015). Among its six visual components, "Alright" won Best Direction at the 2015 MTV Video Music Awards. Lamar also won Video of the Year and Best Collaboration during the ceremony for his featured appearance on singer-songwriter Taylor Swift's music video for "Bad Blood". Directed by Joseph Kahn, it additionally received the Grammy Award for Best Music Video in 2016.

Lamar's fourth studio album, Damn (2017), was supported by music videos primarily directed by Lamar, Free and Dave Meyers. The video for its lead single, "Humble", won six accolades at the 2017 MTV Video Music Awards, including Best Direction and Video of the Year. With his victory in the latter category, Lamar became the first artist to win Video of the Year for a video they co-directed. "Humble" also received the Grammy Award for Best Music Video in 2018. Lamar and Free directed the majority of the visuals for the former's fifth studio album, Mr. Morale & the Big Steppers (2022).

== Music videos ==
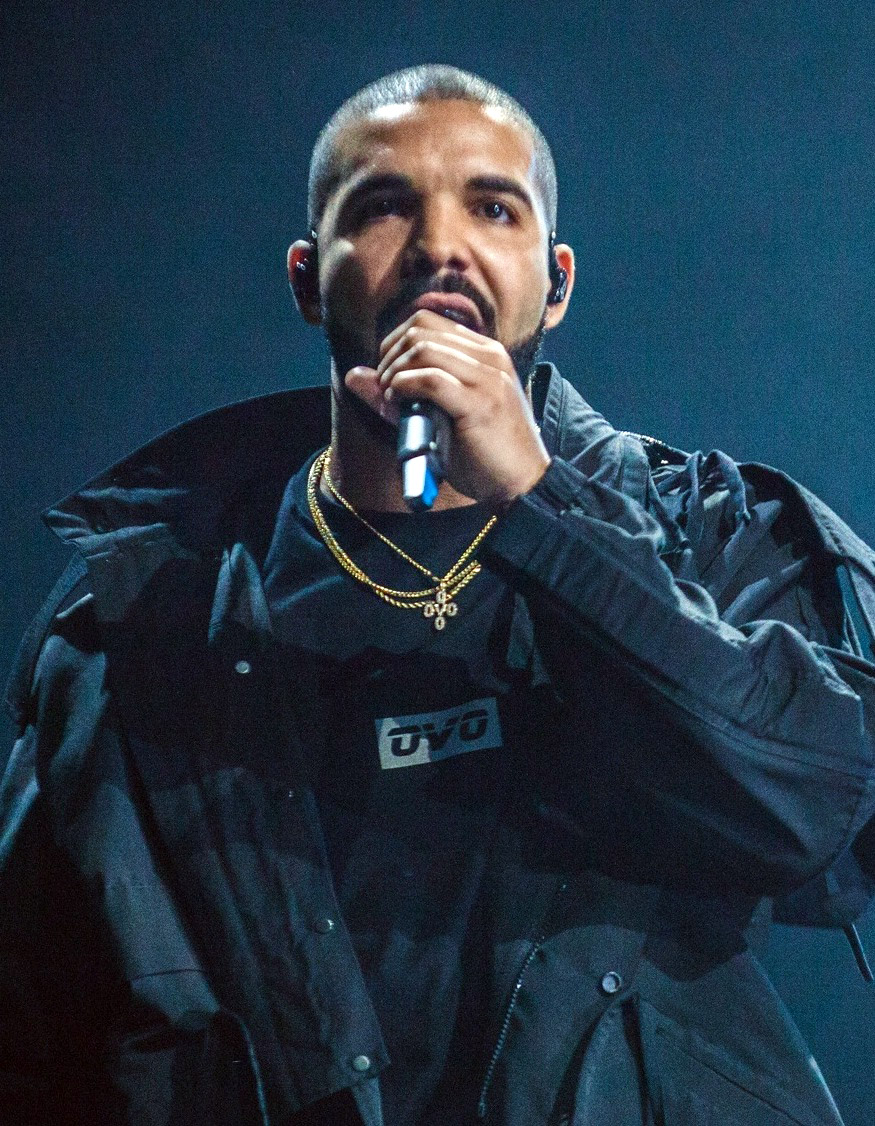
Drake appears on the songs and music videos for "Poetic Justice" and "Fuckin' Problems".

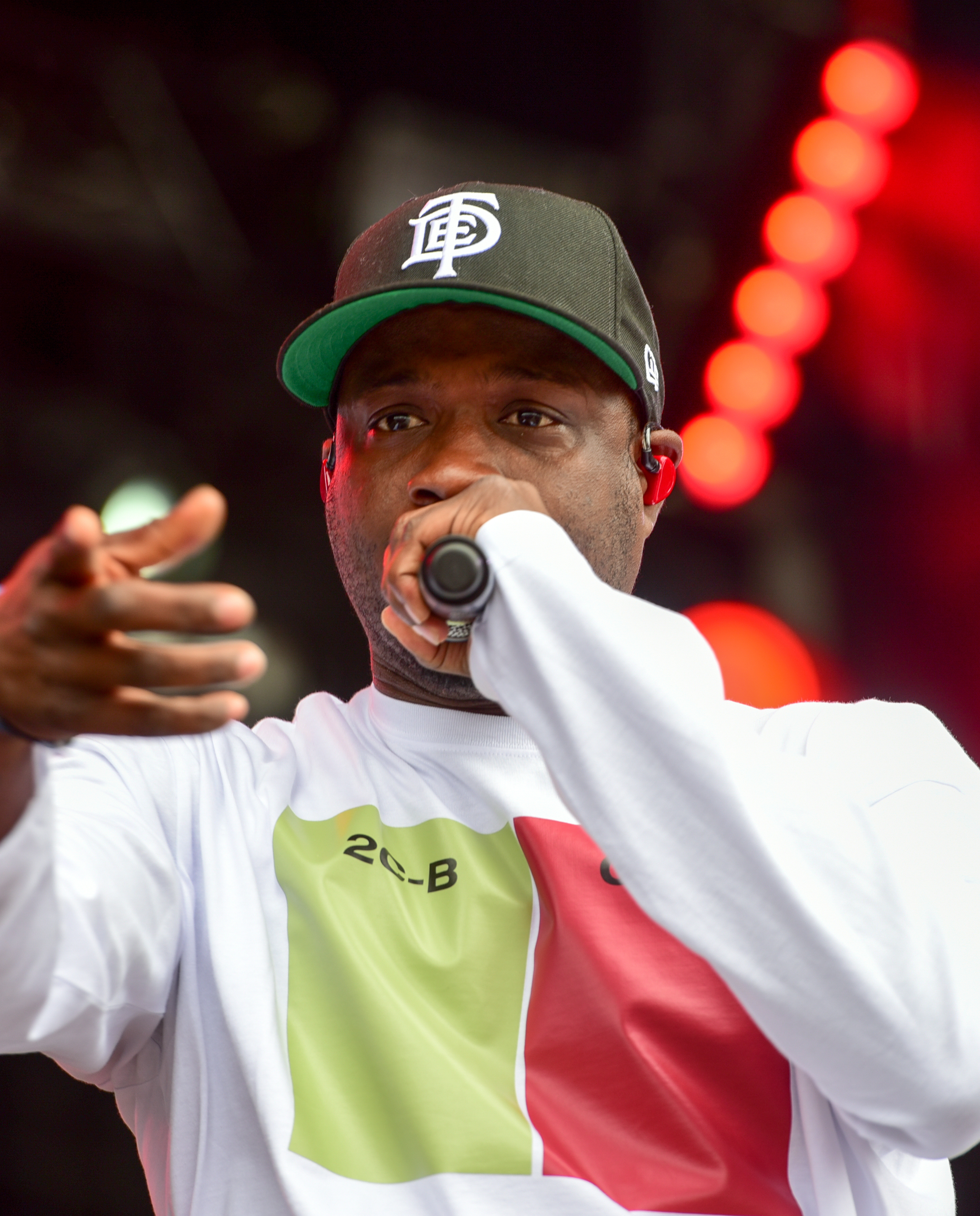
Jay Rock collaborated with Lamar on the songs and music videos for "King's Dead" "Money Trees", and "Win".

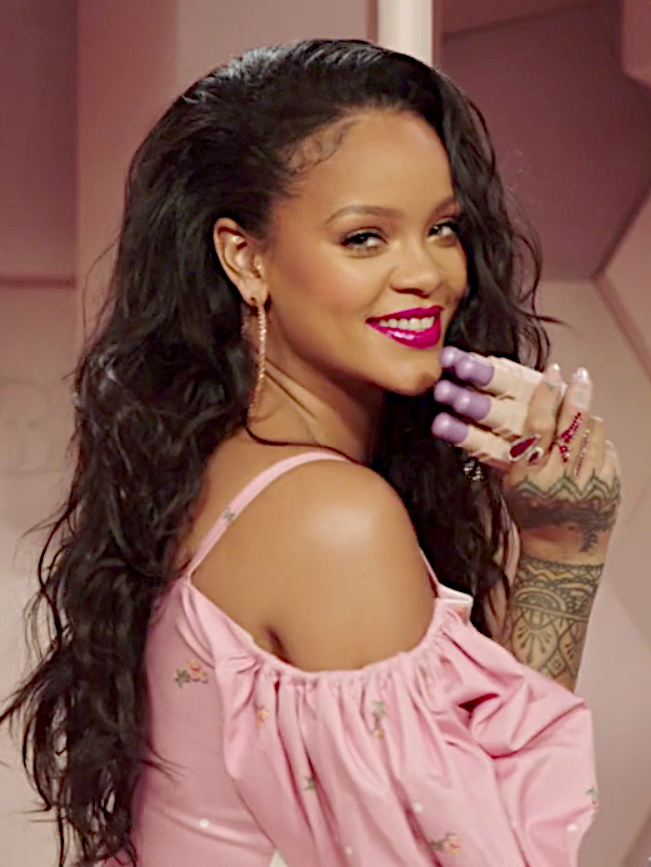
Rihanna features on the song and music video for "Loyalty".

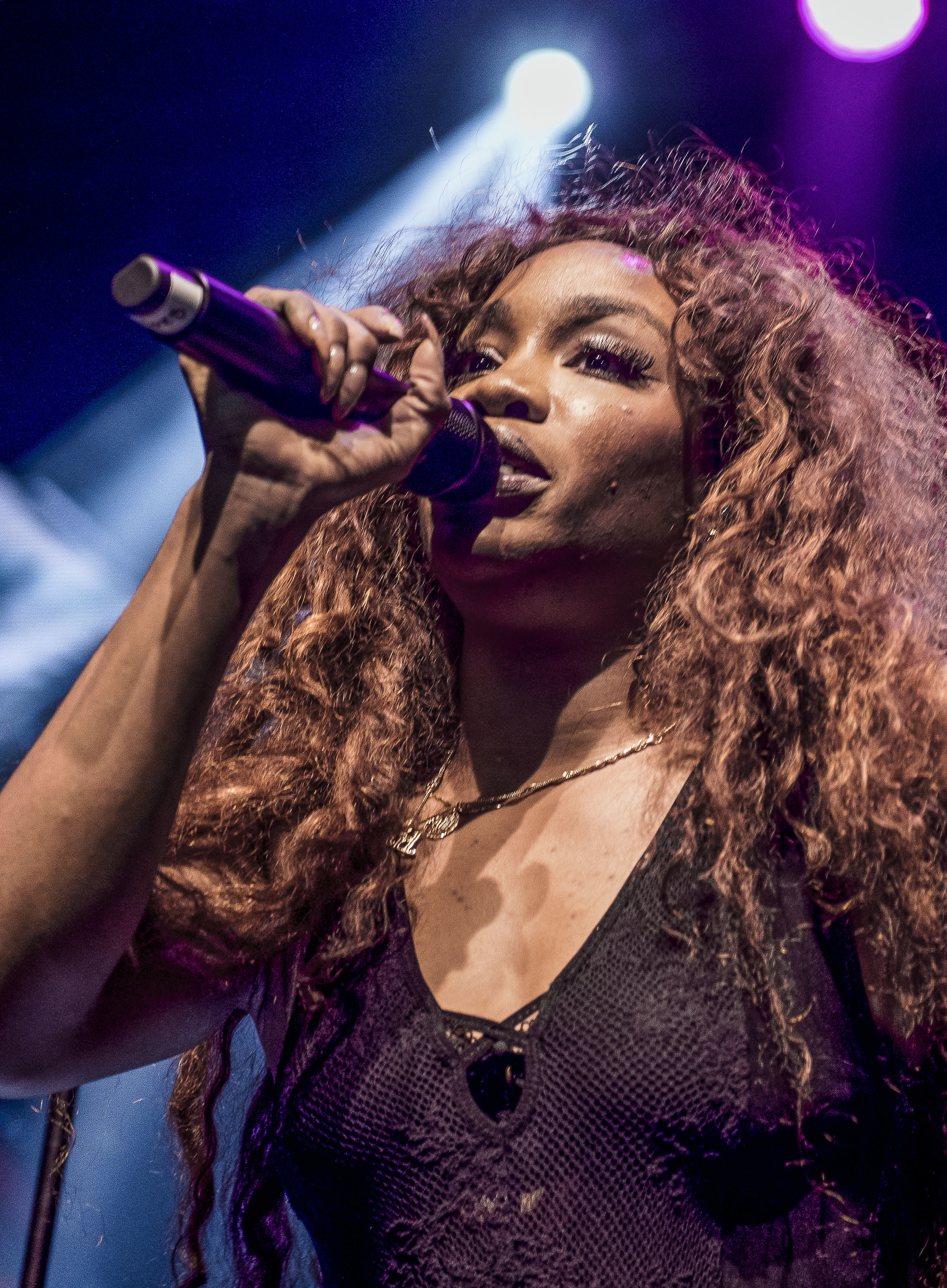
SZA collaborated with Lamar on the song and music video for "All the Stars" and "Luther".

=== As lead artist ===
Title	Year	Other artist(s)	Director(s)	Notes	Album	Ref.
"Bitch I'm in the Club"	2009	—N/a	Dee.Jay.Dave	-	C4	
"Compton State of Mind"	2009	—N/a	Dee.Jay.Dave	-	Compton State of Mind	
"Jason Keaton & Uncle Bobby"	2009	—N/a	Brandon Dimit	-	Kendrick Lamar	
"She Needs Me"	2010	—N/a	Jerome D	-	Kendrick Lamar	
"Ignorance Is Bliss"	2010	—N/a	Dee.Jay.Dave, OG Michael, Mihail	-	Overly Dedicated	
"Monster Freestyle"	2010	—N/a	Calmatic	-	—N/a	
"H.O.C."	2010	—N/a	Jerome D	-	Overly Dedicated	
"Cut You Off"	2010	—N/a	Calmatic	-	Overly Dedicated	
"P&P 1.5"	2010	Ab-Soul	Jerome D	-	Overly Dedicated	
"Michael Jordan"	2010	Schoolboy Q	Fredo Tovar	-	Overly Dedicated	
"HiiiPower"	2011	—N/a	Fredo Tovar, Scott Fleishman	-	Section.80	
"Tammy's Song (Her Evils)"	2011	—N/a	Jerome D	-	Section.80	
"A.D.H.D"	2011	—N/a	Vashtie Kola	-	Section.80	
"Rigamortis"	2011	—N/a	The ICU	-	Section.80	
"Swimming Pools (Drank)"	2012	—N/a	Jerome D	-	Good Kid, M.A.A.D City	
"Backseat Freestyle"	2013	—N/a	Kendrick Lamar, Jerome D, Dee.Jay.Dave	Co-director	Good Kid, M.A.A.D City	
"Poetic Justice"	2013	Drake	The Little Homies, Dee.Jay.Dave, Dangerookipawaa	Co-director	Good Kid, M.A.A.D City	
"Bitch, Don't Kill My Vibe"	2013	—N/a	The Little Homies, OG Mike Mihail	Co-director	Good Kid, M.A.A.D City	
"Sing About Me"	2013	—N/a	Darren Romanelli,	-	Good Kid, M.A.A.D City	
"I"	2014	—N/a	The Little Homies, Alexandre Moors	Co-director	To Pimp A Butterfly	
"King Kunta"	2015	—N/a	Director X	-	To Pimp A Butterfly	
"Alright"	2015	—N/a	The Little Homies, Colin Tilley	Co-director	To Pimp A Butterfly	
"For Free? (Interlude)"	2015	—N/a	The Little Homies, Joe Weil	Co-director	To Pimp A Butterfly	
"These Walls"	2015	—N/a	The Little Homies, Colin Tilley	Co-director	To Pimp A Butterfly	
"God Is Gangsta"	2016	—N/a	The Little Homies, Jack Begert, PANAMÆRA U	Co-director	To Pimp A Butterfly	
"Humble"	2017	—N/a	The Little Homies, Dave Meyers	Co-director	Damn	
"DNA"	2017	—N/a	The Little Homies, Nabil	Co-director	Damn	
"Element"	2017	—N/a	The Little Homies, Jonas Lindstroem	Co-director	Damn	
"Loyalty"	2017	Rihanna	The Little Homies, Dave Meyers	Co-director	Damn	
"Love"	2017	Zacari	The Little Homies, Dave Meyers	Co-director	Damn	
"All the Stars"	2018	SZA	The Little Homies, Dave Meyers	Co-director	Black Panther: The Album	
"Family Ties"	2021	Baby Keem	Dave Free	Executive producer	The Melodic Blue	
"The Heart Part 5"	2022	—N/a	Kendrick Lamar, Dave Free	Co-director and executive producer	Mr. Morale and the Big Steppers	
"N95"	2022	—N/a	Kendrick Lamar, Dave Free	Co-director and executive producer	Mr. Morale and the Big Steppers	
"We Cry Together"	2022	Taylour Paige	Jake Schreier, Dave Free, Kendrick Lamar	Co-director and executive producer	Mr. Morale and the Big Steppers	
"Rich Spirit"	2022	—N/a	Calmatic	Executive producer	Mr. Morale and the Big Steppers	
"Count Me Out"	2022	—N/a	Kendrick Lamar, Dave Free	Co-director and executive producer	Mr. Morale and the Big Steppers	
"The Hillbillies"	2023	Baby Keem	Neal Farmer	-	Non-album single	
"Not Like Us"	2024	—N/a	Dave Free, Kendrick Lamar	-	Non-album single	
"Squabble Up"	2024	—N/a	Calmatic	Executive producer	GNX	
"Luther"	2025	SZA	Karena Evans	Producer	GNX	

=== As featured artist ===
Title	Year	Other artist(s)	Director(s)	Ref.
"Mandatory"	2009	Jay Rock, Ab-Soul	James Curtis	
"Turn Me Up"	2010	Ab-Soul	Calmatic	
"Live Again"	2010	Schoolboy Q, Curtains	Fredo Tovar; Scott, Fleishman	
"Hood Gone Love It"	2011	Jay Rock	Dan Gedman	
"Say Wassup"	2011	Black Hippy	Fredo Tovar	
"Do It Again"	2011	Terrace Martin, Wiz Khalifa	Fredo Tovar, Scott Fleishman	
"Rossi Wine"	2011	Droop-E	Damon Jamal	
"The City"	2012	Game	Matt Alonzo	
"I'm On 2.0"	2012	Trae Tha Truth, J. Cole, Jadakiss, Tyga, Mark Morrison, Gudda Gudda, Bun B, B.o.B	Philly Fly Boy	
"B-Boyz"	2012	Birdman, Mack Maine, Ace Hood	Unknown	
"Catch a Fade"	2012	E-40, Droop-E	Fredo Tovar, Scott Fleishman	
"Power Circle"	2012	Rick Ross, Gunplay, Stalley, Wale, Meek Mill	Dre Films	
"Push Thru"	2012	Talib Kweli; Currensy	Fredo Tovar, Scott Fleishman	
"Black Lip Bastard" (Remix)	2012	Black Hippy	The ICU	
"Fuckin' Problems"	2012	ASAP Rocky; 2 Chainz; Drake	Sam Lecca, Clark Jackson	
"Illuminate"	2013	Ab-Soul	Fredo Tovar, Scott Fleishman	
"YOLO"	2013	The Lonely Island, Adam Levine	Akiva Schaffer; Jorma Taccone	
"We Up"	2013	50 Cent	Eif Rivera	
"How Many Drinks?"	2013	Miguel	Constellation Jones	
"Memories Back Then"	2013	T.I., B.o.B, Kris Stephens	Philly Fly Boy	
"Street Dreamin"	2013	Bridget Kelly	Clifton Bell	
"Collard Greens"	2013	Schoolboy Q	JDDC	
"Give It 2 U" (Remix)	2013	Robin Thicke, 2 Chainz	Diane Martel	
"100 Favors"	2013	Rich Gang: All Stars	^{Unknown}	
"Nosetalgia"	2013	Pusha T	Unknown	
"Fragile"	2014	Tech N9ne, MayDay!, Kendall Morgan	Unknown	
"It's On Again"	2014	Alicia Keys	Rich Lee	
"Babylon"	2014	SZA	A-Plus, SZA	
"Go Off"	2014	Reek da Villian, Ace Hood, Swizz Beatz	Picture Perfect	
"Crime"	2014	Mayer Hawthorne	Rashida Jones	
"That's Me Right There"	2014	Jasmine V	Gil Green	
"Never Catch Me"	2014	Flying Lotus	Hiro Murai	
"Autumn Leaves"	2015	Chris Brown	^{Unknown}	
"Money Over Love"	2015	Bilal	^{Unknown}	
"Bad Blood"	2015	Taylor Swift	Joseph Kahn	
"Classic Man" (Remix)	2015	Jidenna	Benny Boom	
"Ain't That Funkin' Kinda Hard on You?" (Remix)	2016	Funkadelic, Ice Cube	Video God	
"The New Cupid"	2016	BJ the Chicago Kid	^{Unknown}	
"Goosebumps"	2017	Travis Scott	BRTHR	
"Power"	2017	Rapsody, Lance Skiiiwalker	^{Unknown}	
"New Freezer"	2017	Rich the Kid	Dave Free, Jack Begert	
"Perfect Pint"	2017	Mike Will Made It, Gucci Mane, Rae Sremmurd	^{Unknown}	
"King's Dead"	2018	Jay Rock, Future, James Blake	Dave Free, Jack Begert	
"Doves in the Wind"	2018	SZA	Nabil Elderkin	
"Wow Freestyle"	2018	Jay Rock	Jack Begert	
"Tints"	2018	Anderson .Paak	Colin Tilley	
"Hair Down"	2019	SiR	Jack Begert	

=== As producer ===
Title	Year	Artist(s)	Notes	Ref.
"Hooligan"	2020	Baby Keem	Executive producer	
"No Sense"	2021	Baby Keem	Executive producer; credited as K.L.	
"Durag Activity"	2021	Baby Keem, Travis Scott	Executive producer; credited as K.L.	
The Melodic Blue	2021	Baby Keem	Album trailer; executive producer	
"Issues"	2021	Baby Keem	Executive producer; credited as K.L.	
"First Order of Business"	2021	Baby Keem	Executive producer; credited as K.L.	
"16"	2022	Baby Keem	Executive producer; credited as K.L.	
"With The Villains"	2022	Tanna Leone	Executive producer; credited as K.L.	
"Death n’ Taxes"	2022	Tanna Leone	Executive producer; credited as K.L.	

=== Guest appearances ===
Title	Year	Artist(s)	Director(s)	Ref.
"Win"	2018	Jay Rock	Dave Meyers; Dave Free	

== Filmography ==
=== Film ===
Key
†	Denotes films that have not yet been released

Year	Title	Role	Notes	Ref.
2014	Lennon or McCartney	Himself	Short documentary film	
2014	M.A.A.D	Himself	Short film; also producer	
2015	God Is Gangsta	Himself	Short film; also co-director and co-editor	
2017	Louder Together	Himself	Documentary film	
2018	Jay Rock: Road to Redemption	Himself	Documentary film	
2018	Quincy	Himself	Documentary film	
2019	Blue Note Records: Beyond the Notes	Himself	Documentary film	
2022	We Cry Together – A Short Film	The Man	Short film; also co-director, writer, and executive producer	
2022	Kendrick Lamar Live: The Big Steppers Tour	Himself	Concert film; also executive producer	
2022	The Show: California Love	Himself	Documentary film	
2023	Renaissance: A Film by Beyoncé	Himself	Documentary concert film	
2023	The Melodic Blue: Baby Keem	—N/a	Short film; executive producer only	
2024	Piece by Piece	Himself (voice)		
2026	Whitney Springs †	TBA	Post-production; also producer	

=== Television ===
Key
†	Denotes series or specials that have not yet aired

List of television appearances and roles
Title	Year	Role	Network	Notes	Ref.
Late Night with Jimmy Fallon	2012	Himself	NBC	Musical guest	
Conan	2012	Himself	TBS	Musical guest	
Le Grand Journal	2012	Himself	Canal+	Musical guest (two episodes)	
Saturday Night Live	2013	Himself	NBC	Musical guest (S38E12)	
Late Show with David Letterman	2013	Himself	CBS	Musical guest	
Jimmy Kimmel Live!	2013	Himself	ABC	Musical guest	
The Arsenio Hall Show	2013	Himself	CBS	Musical guest	
Saturday Night Live	2014	Himself	NBC	Guest appearance for Imagine Dragons (S39E13)	
Saturday Night Live	2014	Himself	NBC	Musical guest (S40E6)	
The Tonight Show Starring Jimmy Fallon	2014	Himself	NBC	Musical guest	
The Colbert Report	2014	Himself	Comedy Central	Musical guest	
The Ellen DeGeneres Show	2015	Himself	NBC	Musical guest	
The Late Show with Stephen Colbert	2015	Himself	CBS	Musical guest	
The Tonight Show Starring Jimmy Fallon	2016	Himself	NBC	Musical guest	
Noisey	2016	Himself	Viceland	Episode: "Noisey Bompton"	
Unsung	2016	Himself	TV One	Episode: "Kurupt"	
The Defiant Ones	2017	Himself	HBO	Documentary	
Power	2018	Laces	Starz	Episode: "Happy Birthday"	
Saturday Night Live	2018	Himself	NBC	Guest appearance for Anderson .Paak (S44E07)	
Super Bowl LVI halftime show	2022	Himself	NBC	Television special	
Saturday Night Live	2022	Himself	NBC	Musical guest (S48E01)	
Super Bowl LIX halftime show	2025	Himself	Fox	Television special	.
