= Redemption (Jay Rock album) =

2018 album by Jay Rock

Studio album by Jay Rock
- Released: June 15, 2018
- Studio: Windmark; Space Mountain Studio
- Genre: West Coast hip hop
- Length: 44:05
- Label: Top Dawg; Interscope
- Producer: Anthony "Top Dawg" Tiffith; Allen Ritter; Axlfolie; Baby Keem; Boi-1da; Cardo; Crooklin; CT; Cubeatz; DJ Swish; D.K. the Punisher; Hit-Boy; Jake One; Mike Will Made It; Pops; Rascal; Sounwave; Teddy Walton; Terrace Martin; Vinylz

Jay Rock chronology
90059 (2015)	Redemption (2018)

Singles from Redemption
- 1. "King's Dead" Released: January 11, 2018; 2. "Win" Released: May 16, 2018; 3. "The Bloodiest" Released: June 8, 2018

Redemption is the third studio album by American rapper Jay Rock. It was released by Top Dawg Entertainment and Interscope Records on June 15, 2018. The album, which serves as Rock's major-label debut, succeeds his second album 90059 (2015), released three years prior.

The album includes production from a variety of record producers, including Sounwave, Hit-Boy, Mike Will Made It, Boi-1da and TDE label-head Anthony "Top Dawg" Tiffith, who also serves as executive producer. Further production contributions came from Jake One, Teddy Walton, Cardo and Vinylz, among others. The album features Rock's TDE label-mates Kendrick Lamar, SZA, and Sir, as well as guest appearances from Dcmbr, Future, Tee Grizzley, J. Cole, Jeremih, and Mozzy.

It was supported by the lead single "King's Dead", with Kendrick Lamar, Future and James Blake, followed by singles "Win" and "The Bloodiest". The album was met with critical acclaim and debuted at number 13 on the US Billboard 200, selling a total of 31,417 units. The album received two Grammy award nominations for its singles "King's Dead" and "Win", in the respective categories Best Rap Song and Best Rap Performance, winning the latter.

== Background ==
The album was announced by Top Dawg in early January 2018, after being teased for release throughout 2017. Jay Rock formally announced the album's cover art and release date on May 21, 2018.

== Release and promotion ==
The lead single, "King's Dead" with Kendrick Lamar, Future and James Blake, was released on January 11, 2018, also serving as a single from the Black Panther soundtrack. The album version of the song includes an edited version with Future credited a guest appearance.

The second single, "Win", was released on May 16, 2018, for digital download. The third single, "The Bloodiest", was released on June 8, alongside the pre-order for the album.

A listening party was held for the album on May 29, 2018, in New York. In June 2018, a mini-documentary series entitled Road to Redemption was released with three episodes.

On November 28, 2018, the album was further supported by the single "Shit Real" alongside the music video, Redemption was then updated with this track on all streaming platforms.

Again on February 22, 2019, the album was further updated with "The Other Side".

== Critical reception ==
Professional ratings
Aggregate scores
Source	Rating
Metacritic	81/100
Review scores
Source	Rating
The A.V. Club	B+
Exclaim!	7/10
HipHopDX	4.2/5
HotNewHipHop	88%
Pitchfork	8.0/10
XXL	4/5

Redemption was met with critical acclaim upon release. At Metacritic, which assigns a normalized rating out of 100 to reviews from mainstream publications, the album received an average score of 81 based on 10 reviews. Sheldon Pearce of Pitchfork wrote that Redemption is "about Rock getting a second chance at life, a new opportunity to show his pedigree, and about seeking a sort of absolution. The album traces his path from hood survivalist to indie darling of modest means to TDE dark horse and crash survivor, in search of even greater heights."

Chris Gibbons of XXL described Redemption as "the most cohesive of Jay Rock's albums", adding that "he puts up a career high" and "at 44 minutes, the album breezes by without many frills. Rock raps, makes his point, and gets out quickly after, allowing the TDE vet to chalk up his biggest win yet. Online hip hop publication HotNewHipHop praised Redemption for "a pretty well-rounded scope of emotions and moods, despite having no discernible thematic throughline." Kenan Draughorne of HipHopDX believed that "Redemption shines brightest when the music itself matches Rock’s dynamic performance and infuses enough energy for him to seize the moment." Clayton Purdom of The A.V. Club concluded that Redemption is "bleak but ultimately inspirational — and a spotlight on Jay’s resilience", praising Jay Rock's performance and the album's thematic presence.

== Commercial performance ==
Redemption debuted at number 13 on the US Billboard 200 with 31,417 album-equivalent units, of which 9,290 were pure album sales. The album became Jay Rock's highest-charting album to date.

== Track listing ==
Credits adapted from album's liner notes.

No.	Title	Writer(s)	Producer(s)	Length
1.	"The Bloodiest"	Johnny McKinzie; Matthew Samuels; Allen Ritter; Jacob Dutton	Boi-1da; Allen Ritter; Jake One	3:03
2.	"For What It's Worth"	McKinzie; Mark Spears; Tobias Breuer; Brent Wood; Ori Alboher	Sounwave; Rascal^{[c]}	3:08
3.	"Knock It Off"	McKinzie; Hykeem Carter, Jr.; Bianca Casady; Sierra Casady	Baby Keem	3:11
4.	"ES Tales"	McKinzie; Travis Walton	Teddy Walton	3:31
5.	"Rotation 112th"	McKinzie; Carter; Marcello Pacheco; Linnea Schossow; Marcus Schossow	Baby Keem	3:32
6.	"Tap Out" (featuring Jeremih)	McKinzie; Kendrick Duckworth; Donovan Knight; Anthony Tiffith; Jeremy Felton	D.K. the Punisher; Top Dawg	3:20
7.	"OSOM" (featuring J. Cole)	McKinzie; Jermaine Cole; Russell Scott-Wood; Andrew Papaleo; Gerhard Narholz	Crooklin; Pops	5:23
8.	"King's Dead" (featuring Kendrick Lamar & Future)	McKinzie; Duckworth; Tiffith; Michael Williams II; Spears; James Litherland; Nayvadius Wilburn; Samuel Gloade; Antwon Hicks; Axel Morgan	Mike Will Made It; Sounwave^{[a]}; 30 Roc; Twon Beatz; Axlfolie	2:41
9.	"Troopers"	McKinzie; Ronald LaTour; Kevin Gomringer; Tim Gomringer	Cardo; Cubeatz	3:23
10.	"Broke +-"	McKinzie; Knight; R. Franklin	D.K. the Punisher	2:54
11.	"Wow Freestyle" (featuring Kendrick Lamar)	McKinzie; Duckworth; Chauncey Hollis, Jr.; Greg Davis	Hit-Boy; G Dav	2:55
12.	"Redemption" (featuring SZA)	McKinzie; Solána Rowe; Spears; Terrace Martin; Timmy Gatling; Gene Griffin; Aaron Hall; Edward Riley	Sounwave; Martin	3:31
13.	"Win"	McKinzie; Duckworth; Samuels; Anderson Hernandez; Elmer Bernstein; Corey Thompson	Vinylz; CT^{[c]}; Boi-1da^{[c]}	3:35
Total length:				44:06

Reissue track listing
No.	Title	Writer(s)	Producer(s)	Length
14.	"Shit Real" (featuring Tee Grizzley)	McKinzie; Terry Wallace; Samuel Ahana	DJ Swish	2:20
15.	"The Other Side" (featuring Mozzy and Dcmbr)	McKinzie; LaTour; Kyle Williams; Timothy Patterson	Cardo	3:52
Total length:				50:12

Notes

- ^{^[c]} signifies a co-producer
- ^{^[a]} signifies an additional producer
- "OSOM" features additional vocals by Sir.
- "Tap Out", "King's Dead", "Redemption", "Troopers" and "Win" feature uncredited vocals by Kendrick Lamar.
- "Win" is stylized in all caps.

Sample credits

- "For What It's Worth" contains a sample of "Sonder Son (Interlude)", performed by Brent Faiyaz; and "Solo", performed by Ori.
- "Knock It Off" contains a sample of "Trinity's Crying", performed by CocoRosie.
- "OSOM" contains a sample of "Sailing Dreams", performed by Sieben.
- "Broke +-" contains an uncredited sample of "A Garden of Peace", written and performed by Lonnie Liston Smith.
- "Redemption" contains an interpolation of "Piece of My Love", performed by Guy.
- "Win" contains an original sample of "Rooster and Runaway (from True Grit)", composed by Elmer Bernstein, as performed by the Utah Symphony orchestra.

== Personnel ==
Credits adapted from official liner notes.

- Aron Levi – designee synth (track 5)
- Matt Schaeffer – recording (except tracks 4 and 14), mixing (track 8)
- James Hunt – recording (tracks 4, 6)
- Dan Joeright – recording (track 12 SZA vocals)
- Derek "MixedbyAli" Ali – mixing (except tracks 8 and 14)
- Cyrus "Nois" Taghipour – mixing (tracks 6, 7, 9)
- Aria Angel Ali – mixing (tracks 6, 7, 9)
- Mike Bozzi – mastering (tracks 8, 15)

== Charts ==
=== Weekly charts ===
Chart (2018)	Peak position
Australian Albums (ARIA)	37
Belgian Albums (Ultratop Flanders)	64
Belgian Albums (Ultratop Wallonia)	167
Canadian Albums (Billboard)	20
Dutch Albums (Album Top 100)	66
Irish Albums (IRMA)	81
New Zealand Albums (RMNZ)	33
Swiss Albums (Schweizer Hitparade)	68
UK Albums (OCC)	72
US Billboard 200	13
US Top R&B/Hip-Hop Albums (Billboard)	9

=== Year-end charts ===
Chart (2018)	Position
US Top R&B/Hip-Hop Albums (Billboard)	92
