= Money Without Me =

2024 song by Kendrick Lamar

Song by Kendrick Lamar
- Released: December 17, 2024
- Recorded: 2011
- Length: 3:22

"Money Without Me" is a song posted to Kendrick Lamar's YouTube channel on December 17, 2024. It was removed from his channel shortly after, but re-released with different cover art on February 11, 2025. Due to its limited release, as well as being taken down by Universal Music Group, it is heavily speculated that its release was unofficial.

== Background and release ==
"Money Without Me" was recorded during sessions for Lamar's debut studio album, Section.80 (2011). The song had already leaked online prior to being uploaded to YouTube.

"Money Without Me" was uploaded to Lamar's Youtube Channel on December 17, 2024. It marked Lamar's first release after the release of his November studio album, GNX. The upload came with no credits, as they were auto-generated by YouTube.

Shortly after, the video became unlisted, then made public again, then struck with a copyright claim by Universal Music Group. On December 18, the song was taken down, but made public again on December 25.

Some believe the upload was a teaser for a deluxe edition of GNX, especially due to the song's cover art featuring the car shown on the album's cover art. Lefty Gunplay, who was featured on Lamar's song "TV Off", stated in an interview at the end of November 2024 that a deluxe edition could be released soon.

== Production ==
The song incorporates synth and piano instrumentation over Lamar's introspective lyrics about growing up in Compton, California. The lyrics reference Snoop Dogg's debut studio album, Doggystyle, as well as P Diddy and long-time collaborator Dr. Dre.

== Critical reception ==
Fotis of Hit Channel called the unexpected upload of "Money Without Me" as a "bridge" between "two defining moments in Kendrick's career—his Section.80 origins and the present-day dominance of his GNX era." They wrote that "The song's poignant storytelling and throwback production style are drawing praise from fans, with many expressing nostalgia for the rawness of his early day. The drop also complements the lyrical themes of GNX, cementing Kendrick's ability to honor his roots while exploring new creative territory."
