= Win (song) =

2018 single by Jay Rock

Single by Jay Rock

from the album Redemption
- Released: May 16, 2018
- Genre: Hip hop; trap
- Length: 3:35
- Label: TDE; Interscope
- Songwriters: Johnny McKinzie Jr.; Kendrick Duckworth; Matthew Samuels; Anderson Hernandez; Elmer Bernstein; Corey Thompson
- Producers: Vinylz; Boi-1da (co.); CT (co.)

Jay Rock singles chronology
"King's Dead" (2018)	"Win" (2018)	"The Bloodiest" (2018)

Music video
- "Win" on YouTube

"Win" (stylized in all caps) is a song by American rapper Jay Rock, released on May 16, 2018 as the second single from his third studio album Redemption (2018). It features backing vocals from American rapper Kendrick Lamar and was produced by Vinylz, with co-production handled by Boi-1da and CT.

== Composition ==
"Win" contains a sample of "Rooster and Runaway (from True Grit)", composed by Elmer Bernstein, and uses a trap beat that features celebratory-sounding trumpets and drums. Throughout the track, Kendrick Lamar provides ad-libs in the background. The song begins with a horn riff, and a chorus performed by Jay Rock, who raps about triumphing over adversity while also delivering boastful lyrics and claiming his position as a winner in the rap game.

== Music video ==
A music video for the song was released on May 30, 2018. Directed by Dave Meyers and Dave Free, it opens with Jay Rock and Kendrick Lamar dressed in suits while surrounded by trumpeters and flames. The video sees Rock dodging missiles in the middle of a war zone, celebrating with a championship trophy, hunting ducks with Lamar, surrounded by masked men brandishing bayonets, playing pool, staging a 300-inspired execution off the roof of a building, reclining with several women and hanging out a convertible. Top Dawg Entertainment artists SZA, Ab-Soul, Isaiah Rashad, Sir, Zacari and Lance Skiiiwalker make cameos in the video.

== In other media ==
The instrumental for “Win” is featured in the Netflix film The After Party (2018) for the character KYLE plays in the film to rap over. The song is the theme song for the Netflix television show #blackAF (2020).

== Remixes ==
Jay Rock released a remix of the song endorsing Stacey Abrams' campaign for the 2018 Georgia gubernatorial election, on October 24, 2018. On October 30, 2018, the official remix featuring American rapper Snoop Dogg was released.

== Charts ==
Chart (2018)	Peak position
US Bubbling Under Hot 100 (Billboard)	20
US Bubbling Under R&B/Hip-Hop Singles (Billboard)	4

== Certifications ==
Region	Certification	Certified units/sales
United States (RIAA)	Gold	500,000^{‡}
^{‡} Sales+streaming figures based on certification alone.
