= King's Dead =

2018 single by Jay Rock, Kendrick Lamar, Future and James Blake

Single by Jay Rock, Kendrick Lamar, Future and James Blake

from the album Black Panther: The Album and Redemption
- Released: January 11, 2018
- Recorded: 2017
- Genre: Alternative hip-hop; trap
- Length: 3:50: 2:40 (Redemption version)
- Label: TDE; Aftermath; Interscope
- Songwriters: Kendrick Duckworth; Michael Williams; Travis Walton; Mark Spears; Johnny McKinzie; Nayvadius Wilburn; James Litherland; Samuel Gloade; Anthony Tiffith; Antwon Hicks; Axel Morgan
- Producers: Mike Will Made It; Teddy Walton; Sounwave; 30 Roc^{[a]}; Twon Beatz^{[a]}; Axlfolie

Jay Rock singles chronology
"90059" (2015)	"King's Dead" (2018)	"Win" (2018)

Kendrick Lamar singles chronology
"Don't Don't Do It" (2018)	"King's Dead" (2018)	"Pray for Me" (2018)

Future singles chronology
"Bum Bum Tam Tam (Remix)" (2017)	"King's Dead" (2018)	"Faded Love" (2018)

James Blake singles chronology
"Vincent" (2017)	"King's Dead" (2018)	"If the Car Beside You Moves Ahead" (2018)

Music video
- "King's Dead" on YouTube

"King's Dead" is a song by American rappers Jay Rock, Kendrick Lamar, and Future with English singer James Blake, from the soundtrack album of the Marvel Studios superhero film Black Panther and Jay Rock's third studio album Redemption. The version featured on Redemption did not feature Blake, only contained Lamar for the hook and contains multiple differences to the original one.

It was released by Top Dawg Entertainment, Aftermath Entertainment and Interscope Records on January 11, 2018, as both the soundtrack's second single and as the lead single from Redemption. The song is Jay Rock's first single to chart on the Billboard Hot 100. The song, along with "Bubblin" by Anderson .Paak, won Best Rap Performance, and was nominated for Best Rap Song at the 61st Annual Grammy Awards.

== Reception ==
Briana Younger of Pitchfork gave the song a positive review, calling the song "fun and swaggering".

== Music video ==
The music video for the song was released to Rock's Vevo channel on YouTube on February 15, 2018. It was directed by Dave Free and Jack Begert.

== Remixes ==
On March 8, 2018, American rappers Joey Badass and XXXTentacion released a remix of the song.

== Personnel ==
Credits adapted from digital booklet.

=== Performers ===
- Jay Rock – vocals
- Kendrick Lamar – vocals
- Future – vocals
- James Blake – vocals

=== Technical ===
- Matt Schaeffer – record engineering, mix engineering
- Mike Bozzi – master engineering
- Eric Manco – record engineering

=== Production ===
- Kendrick Lamar – production
- Teddy Walton – production
- Sounwave – additional production
- 30 Roc – uncredited co-production
- Twon Beatz – uncredited co-production

== Charts ==
=== Weekly charts ===
Chart (2018)	Peak position
Australia (ARIA)	58
Canada Hot 100 (Billboard)	23
Greece (IFPI Greece)	28
Ireland (IRMA)	51
Netherlands (Single Tip)	6
New Zealand Heatseekers (Recorded Music NZ)	4
Portugal (AFP)	64
Sweden Heatseeker (Sverigetopplistan)	1
UK Singles (OCC)	50
UK Hip Hop/R&B (OCC)	25
US Billboard Hot 100	21
US Hot R&B/Hip-Hop Songs (Billboard)	13
US Rhythmic Airplay (Billboard)	33

=== Year-end charts ===
Chart (2018)	Position
Canada (Canadian Hot 100)	97
US Billboard Hot 100	79
US Hot R&B/Hip-Hop Songs (Billboard)	41

== Certifications ==
Region	Certification	Certified units/sales
Brazil (Pro-Música Brasil)	Platinum	40,000^{‡}
Canada (Music Canada)	3× Platinum	240,000^{‡}
Denmark (IFPI Danmark)	Gold	45,000^{‡}
New Zealand (RMNZ)	2× Platinum	60,000^{‡}
Poland (ZPAV)	Gold	25,000^{‡}
United Kingdom (BPI)	Gold	400,000^{‡}
United States (RIAA)	4× Platinum	4,000,000^{‡}
^{‡} Sales+streaming figures based on certification alone.

== Release history ==
Region	Date	Format	Label(s)	Ref.
Various	January 11, 2018	Digital download; streaming	Top Dawg; Aftermath; Interscope	
United States	January 30, 2018	Rhythmic contemporary	Top Dawg; Aftermath; Interscope	

== Notes ==
- ^{^[a]} signifies an uncredited co-producer
